= Hardin High School (Montana) =

Public school located in Hardin, Big Horn, Montana, United States

Location
- 721 North Miles Ave; Hardin, Montana 59034; United States; 45.73561°N 107.61583°W

Information
- Type: Public
- School district: Hardin School District
- Principal: Robert Hankins
- Faculty: 32.02 (on FTE basis)
- Grades: 9-12
- Enrollment: 540 (2023-2024)
- Student to teacher ratio: 16.86
- Colors: Black & Orange
- Athletics conference: MHSA Southeastern A
- Mascot: Bulldog
- Website: Hardin High School

Hardin High School is a public high school serving students grades 9–12 located in the city of Hardin, Big Horn County, Montana, United States. As part of the Hardin School District, it is attended by students residing within the city of Hardin and unincorporated communities in Big Horn County, including Crow Agency, Montana, Dunmore, Garryowen, St. Xavier, Fort Smith, Yellowtail, Toluca, Foster, and Corinth. It is the only high school within the Hardin High School District and one of the only two secondary schools part of the Hardin School District. It participates in Montana High School Association classified as Southeastern A.

== Athletics ==
The Hardin Bulldogs compete in the following sports:

- Basketball
- Cross Country
- Football
- Golf
- Swimming
- Track and Field
- Volleyball
- Wrestling

=== State championships ===
- Basketball–
  - 1949 (B)
  - 1948 (B)
  - 1995 (A)
  - 1997 (A)
  - 2018 (A)
  - 2020 (A)
- Girls' Basketball-
  - 1994 (A)
  - 2020 (A)
- Cross County-
  - 1985 (A)
  - 1988 (A)
  - 1992 (A)
  - 1993 (A)
- Girls' Cross country-
  - 1991 (A)
  - 2016 (A)
  - 2017 (A)
  - 2018 (A)
  - 2019 (A)
  - 2023 (A)
- Swimming -
  - 2009 (A)
  - 2008 (A)
  - 1999 (A)
- Girls' Swimming -
  - 1996 (A)
- Tennis -
  - 2018 (A)
- Girls' Tennis -
  - 1997 (A)
- Track and Field -
  - 1960 (A)
- Volleyball -
  - 1993 (A)
  - 1994 (A)
  - 1995 (A)
  - 2000 (A)
  - 2002 (A)
  - 2023 (A)

== Notable people ==
- Kroy Biermann, American football player and actor
- Tim Fox (politician), American politician and former Montana Attorney General
- Edd Bearss, American historian and soldier
