= Hardin School District =

School district in Montana, United States

Hardin School District is a school district based in Hardin, Big Horn County, Montana, United States. It is composed of the Hardin High School District and Hardin Elementary School District.

The district, in serves different communities of Big Horn County, including the city of Hardin, and unincorporated communities of Crow Agency, Montana, Dunmore, Garryowen, St. Xavier, Fort Smith, Yellowtail, Toluca, Foster, and Corinth.

The Hardin High School District contains an exclave of approximately 100 square miles further southwest towards the Wyoming-Montana border, within which the unincorporated Decker is within.

== Schools ==
=== Secondary ===
- Hardin High School (9-12)
- Hardin Middle School (6-8)

=== Primary ===
==== PK-5 ====
- Fort Smith School
- Crow Agency School

==== 3-5 ====
- Hardin Intermediate School

==== PK-2 ====
- Hardin Primary School
