= Busby, Montana =

Census-designated place in Big Horn County, Montana, United States

Busby, Montana Vóhpoométanéno
- CDP
- Location of Busby, Montana
- Coordinates: 45°30′34″N 106°59′40″W
- Country: United States
- State: Montana
- County: Big Horn

Area
  - Total: 14.35 sq mi (37.17 km^{2})
  - Land: 14.32 sq mi (37.08 km^{2})
  - Water: 0.035 sq mi (0.09 km^{2})
- Elevation: 3,438 ft (1,048 m)

Population (2020)
  - Total: 719
  - Density: 50.2/sq mi (19.39/km^{2})
- Time zone: UTC-7 (Mountain (MST))
  - Summer (DST): UTC-6 (MDT)
- ZIP code: 59016
- Area code: 406
- FIPS code: 30-11200
- GNIS: 2407928

Busby (Cheyenne: Vóhpoométanéno) is a census-designated place (CDP) in Big Horn County, Montana, United States. It is on the Northern Cheyenne Indian Reservation. The population was 719 at the 2020 census. It was 745 at the 2010 census.

== History ==
The town is approximately 20 miles (32 km) northeast of the site of the Battle of the Rosebud and the associated Rosebud Battlefield State Park, where General George Crook's forces encountered Sioux and Cheyenne forces led by Crazy Horse.

The town is named for postmaster Sheridan Busby. The post office was established in 1904.

Belle Highwalking, an American Indian writer, was taught by her uncle at Busby School in the early 1900s.

The Alvin Young Barn and Cabin Historic District is listed on the National Register of Historic Places. The Young family began ranching in the area in the late 1890s. By the time of his death in 1928, Alvin Young owned 970 acres of land.

Nearby is the Moncure Tipi, a structure built in 1931 by Walker P. Moncure as a gathering place and dance hall. Moncure later erected the Two Moons Monument at Busby.

== Geography ==
The community is located on Rosebud Creek and U.S. Route 212.

According to the United States Census Bureau, the CDP has a total area of 14.2 square miles (37 km^{2}), of which 14.2 square miles (37 km^{2}) is land and 0.1 square miles (0.26 km^{2}) (0.35%) is water.

== Demographics ==
Historical population
Census	Pop.	Note	%±
2020	719		—
U.S. Decennial Census

As of the census of 2000, there were 695 people, 177 households, and 147 families residing in the CDP. The population density was 49.0 inhabitants per square mile (18.9/km^{2}). There were 201 housing units at an average density of 14.2 per square mile (5.5/km^{2}). The racial makeup of the CDP was 6.33% White, 89.50% Native American, 0.14% from other races, and 4.03% from two or more races. Hispanic or Latino of any race were 3.31% of the population.

There were 177 households, out of which 54.2% had children under the age of 18 living with them, 54.2% were married couples living together, 22.0% had a female householder with no husband present, and 16.4% were non-families. 14.7% of all households were made up of individuals, and 5.6% had someone living alone who was 65 years of age or older. The average household size was 3.93 and the average family size was 4.34.

In the CDP, the population was spread out, with 46.2% under the age of 18, 7.3% from 18 to 24, 25.5% from 25 to 44, 16.4% from 45 to 64, and 4.6% who were 65 years of age or older. The median age was 21 years. For every 100 females there were 99.1 males. For every 100 females age 18 and over, there were 94.8 males.

The median income for a household in the CDP was $28,750, and the median income for a family was $30,625. Males had a median income of $25,208 versus $25,250 for females. The per capita income for the CDP was $8,383. About 30.2% of families and 35.8% of the population were below the poverty line, including 41.4% of those under age 18 and 32.4% of those age 65 or over.

== Climate ==
According to the Köppen Climate Classification system, Busby has a semi-arid climate, abbreviated "BSk" on climate maps.

Climate data for Busby, Montana, 1991–2020 normals, extremes 1907–present
Month	Jan	Feb	Mar	Apr	May	Jun	Jul	Aug	Sep	Oct	Nov	Dec	Year
Record high °F (°C)	69 (21)	72 (22)	84 (29)	87 (31)	97 (36)	107 (42)	109 (43)	107 (42)	105 (41)	95 (35)	82 (28)	76 (24)	109 (43)
Mean maximum °F (°C)	53.1 (11.7)	55.8 (13.2)	70.7 (21.5)	79.4 (26.3)	85.6 (29.8)	93.3 (34.1)	100.3 (37.9)	98.6 (37.0)	94.7 (34.8)	83.4 (28.6)	68.9 (20.5)	55.2 (12.9)	101.5 (38.6)
Mean daily maximum °F (°C)	34.1 (1.2)	37.3 (2.9)	49.4 (9.7)	58.7 (14.8)	68.2 (20.1)	78.1 (25.6)	88.4 (31.3)	87.7 (30.9)	76.7 (24.8)	60.5 (15.8)	46.3 (7.9)	35.5 (1.9)	60.1 (15.6)
Daily mean °F (°C)	21.3 (−5.9)	24.3 (−4.3)	35.3 (1.8)	44.1 (6.7)	53.4 (11.9)	62.7 (17.1)	70.6 (21.4)	69.1 (20.6)	59.0 (15.0)	45.4 (7.4)	32.6 (0.3)	22.7 (−5.2)	45.0 (7.2)
Mean daily minimum °F (°C)	8.5 (−13.1)	11.3 (−11.5)	21.3 (−5.9)	29.5 (−1.4)	38.7 (3.7)	47.3 (8.5)	52.8 (11.6)	50.5 (10.3)	41.3 (5.2)	30.3 (−0.9)	18.9 (−7.3)	9.8 (−12.3)	30.0 (−1.1)
Mean minimum °F (°C)	−20.6 (−29.2)	−14.4 (−25.8)	−2.9 (−19.4)	13.3 (−10.4)	23.9 (−4.5)	34.3 (1.3)	42.0 (5.6)	38.2 (3.4)	26.5 (−3.1)	11.0 (−11.7)	−6.0 (−21.1)	−14.8 (−26.0)	−29.5 (−34.2)
Record low °F (°C)	−52 (−47)	−53 (−47)	−36 (−38)	−12 (−24)	10 (−12)	18 (−8)	32 (0)	26 (−3)	6 (−14)	−21 (−29)	−38 (−39)	−52 (−47)	−53 (−47)
Average precipitation inches (mm)	0.69 (18)	0.71 (18)	0.95 (24)	1.66 (42)	2.71 (69)	2.11 (54)	1.38 (35)	1.01 (26)	1.58 (40)	1.50 (38)	0.78 (20)	0.64 (16)	15.72 (400)
Average snowfall inches (cm)	9.9 (25)	9.7 (25)	7.3 (19)	5.7 (14)	0.9 (2.3)	0.0 (0.0)	0.0 (0.0)	0.0 (0.0)	0.2 (0.51)	3.8 (9.7)	6.2 (16)	8.6 (22)	52.3 (133.51)
Average precipitation days (≥ 0.01 in)	7.6	6.7	6.7	8.1	9.2	7.9	5.8	4.3	5.3	6.9	5.8	6.3	80.6
Average snowy days (≥ 0.1 in)	6.2	5.6	3.9	2.6	0.5	0.0	0.0	0.0	0.0	1.7	3.8	5.7	30.0
Source 1: NOAA
Source 2: National Weather Service

== Education ==
Northern Cheyenne Tribal Schools educate students from kindergarten through 12th grade. Northern Cheyenne High School's team name is the Eagles.

The traditional public school districts serving the area include Lodge Grass Elementary School District and Lame Deer High School District.
