= List of school districts in Montana =

This is a list of school districts in Montana. Many schools in Montana are self-administered — that is, not part of a larger district — and are thus counted as individual districts by the state of Montana and the National Center for Education Statistics.

The U.S. Census Bureau counts elementary school districts and unified K-12 school districts as separate governments, while the high school districts are dependent on their elementary school districts. No Montana school systems are dependent on other layers of government.

== Beaverhead County ==
- Beaverhead County High School
- Dillon Elementary School
- Grant Elementary School
- Jackson Elementary School
- Lima K-12 Schools
- Polaris Elementary School
- Reichle Elementary School
- Wisdom Elementary School
- Wise River Elementary School

== Big Horn County ==
=== BIE ===
- Northern Cheyenne Tribal School

=== Public ===
- Hardin Elementary School District/Hardin High School District
- Lodge Grass Elementary School/Lodge Grass High School
- Plenty Coups High School
- Pryor Elementary School
- Wyola Elementary School

== Blaine County ==
- Chinook Elementary School/Chinook High School
- Cleveland Elementary School
- Harlem Elementary School/Harlem High School
- Hays-Lodge Pole K-12 Schools
- North Harlem Colony Elementary School
- Turner Elementary School/Turner High School
- Zurich Elementary School

== Carbon County ==
- Belfry K-12 Schools
- Bridger K-12 Schools
- Fromberg K-12 Schools
- Joliet Elementary School/Joliet High School
- Luther Elementary School
- Red Lodge Elementary School/Red Lodge High School
- Roberts K-12 Schools

== Carter County ==
- Alzada Elementary School
- Carter County High School
- Ekalaka Elementary School

== Cascade County ==
- Belt Elementary School/Belt High School
- Cascade Elementary School/Cascade High School
- Centerville Elementary School/Centerville High School
- Great Falls Elementary School/Great Falls High School
- Simms High School
- Sun River Valley Elementary School
- Ulm Elementary School
- Vaughn Elementary School

== Chouteau County ==
- Big Sandy K-12 Schools
- Carter Elementary School
- Fort Benton Elementary School/Fort Benton High School
- Geraldine K-12 Schools
- Highwood K-12 Schools

== Custer County ==
- Custer County High School
- Kinsey Elementary School
- Miles City Elementary School
- SH Elementary School

== Daniels County ==
- Peerless K-12 Schools
- Scobey K-12 Schools

== Dawson County ==
- Dawson High School
- Deer Park Elementary School
- Glendive Elementary School
- Lindsay Elementary School
- Richey Elementary School/Richey High School

== Fallon County ==
- Baker K-12 Schools
- Plevna K-12 Schools

== Fergus County ==
- Ayers Elementary School
- Deerfield Elementary School
- Denton Elementary School/Denton High School
- Fergus High School
- Grass Range Elementary School/Grass Range High School
- Lewistown Elementary School
- Moore Elementary School/Moore High School
- Roy K-12 Schools
- Winifred K-12 Schools

== Flathead County ==
- Bigfork Elementary School/Bigfork High School
- Cayuse Prairie Elementary School
- Columbia Falls Elementary School/Columbia Falls High School
- Creston Elementary School
- Deer Park Elementary School
- Evergreen Elementary School
- Fair-Mont-Egan Elementary School
- Flathead High School
- Glacier High School
- Helena Flats Elementary School
- Kalispell Middle School
- Kila Elementary School
- Marion Elementary School
- Olney-Bissell Elementary School
- Pleasant Valley Elementary School
- Smith Valley Elementary School
- Somers Lakeside Elementary School
- Swan River Elementary School
- West Glacier Elementary School
- West Valley Elementary School
- Whitefish Elementary School/Whitefish High School

== Gallatin County ==
- Amsterdam Elementary School
- Anderson Elementary School
- Belgrade Elementary School/Belgrade High School
- Big Sky K-12 Schools
- Bozeman Public Schools
- Cottonwood Elementary School (Gallatin County)
- Gallatin Gateway Elementary School
- Lamotte Elementary School
- Malmborg Elementary School
- Manhattan Elementary School/Manhattan High School
- Monforton Elementary School
- Pass Creek Elementary School
- Springhill Elementary School
- Three Forks Elementary School/Three Forks High School
- West Yellowstone K-12
- Willow Creek Elementary School/Willow Creek High School

== Garfield County ==
- Cohagen Elementary School
- Garfield County High School
- Jordan Elementary School
- Kester Elementary School
- Pine Grove Elementary School
- Ross Elementary School

== Glacier County ==
- Browning Elementary School/Browning High School
- Cut Bank Elementary School/Cut Bank High School
- East Glacier Park Elementary School
- Mountain View Elementary School

== Golden Valley County ==
- Lavina K-12 Schools
- Ryegate K-12 Schools

== Granite County ==
- Drummond Elementary School/Drummond High School
- Hall Elementary School
- Philipsburg K-12 Schools

== Hill County ==
- Box Elder Elementary School/Box Elder High School
- Cottonwood Elementary School (Hill County)
- Havre Elementary School/Havre High School
- North Star Elementary School/North Star High School
- Rocky Boy Elementary School/Rocky Boy High School

== Jefferson County ==
- Basin Elementary School
- Boulder Elementary School
- Cardwell Elementary School
- Clancy Elementary School
- Jefferson High School
- Montana City Elementary School
- Whitehall Elementary School/Whitehall High School

== Judith Basin County ==
- Geyser Elementary School/Geyser High School
- Hobson K-12 Schools
- Stanford K-12 Schools

== Lake County ==
=== BIE ===
- Two Eagle River School

=== Public ===
- Arlee Elementary School/Arlee High School
- Charlo Elementary School/Charlo High School
- Dayton Elementary School
- Polson Elementary School/Polson High School
- Ronan Elementary School/Ronan High School
- Saint Ignatius K-12 Schools
- Swan Lake-Salmon Elementary School
- Valley View Elementary School

== Lewis and Clark County ==
- Auchard Creek Elementary School
- Augusta Elementary School/Augusta High School
- East Helena K-12 Schools
- Helena Elementary School/Helena High School
- Lincoln K-12 Schools
- Trinity Elementary School
- Wolf Creek Elementary School

== Liberty County ==
- Chester-Joplin-Inverness Elementary School/Chester-Joplin-Inverness High School
- Liberty Elementary School

== Lincoln County ==
- Eureka Elementary School
- Fortine Elementary School
- Libby K-12 Schools
- Lincoln County High School
- McCormick Elementary School
- Trego Elementary School
- Troy Elementary School/Troy High School
- Yaak Elementary School

== Madison County ==
- Alder Elementary School
- Ennis K-12 Schools
- Harrison K-12 Schools
- Sheridan Elementary School/Sheridan High School
- Twin Bridges K-12 Schools

== McCone County ==
- Circle Elementary School/Circle High School
- Vida Elementary School

== Mineral County ==
- Alberton K-12 Schools
- Saint Regis K-12 Schools
- Superior K-12 Schools

== Missoula County ==
- Bonner Elementary School
- Clinton Elementary School
- DeSmet Elementary School
- Frenchtown K-12 Schools
- Hellgate Elementary School/Hellgate High School
- Lolo Elementary School
- Missoula Elementary School/Missoula High School
- Potomac Elementary School
- Seeley Lake Elementary School
- Swan Valley Elementary School
- Target Range Elementary School
- Woodman Elementary School

== Musselshell County ==
- Melstone Elementary School/Melstone High School
- Roundup Elementary School/Roundup High School

== Park County ==
- Arrowhead Elementary School
- Cooke City Elementary School
- Gardiner Elementary School/Gardiner High School
- Livingston Elementary School
- Park High School
- Pine Creek Elementary School
- Shields Valley Elementary School/Shields Valley High School

== Phillips County ==
- Dodson K-12 Schools
- Malta K-12 Schools
- Saco Elementary School/Saco High School
- Whitewater K-12 Schools

== Pondera County ==
- Conrad Elementary School/Conrad High School
- Heart Butte K-12 Schools
- Miami Elementary School District
- Valier Elementary School/Valier High School

== Powder River County ==
- Broadus Elementary School
- Powder River County District High School

== Powell County ==
- Avon Elementary School
- Deer Lodge Elementary School
- Powell County High School

== Ravalli County ==
- Corvallis K-12 Schools
- Darby K-12 Schools
- Florence-Carlton K-12 Schools
- Hamilton K-12 Schools
- Lone Rock Elementary School
- Stevensville Elementary School/Stevensville High School
- Victor K-12 Schools

== Richland County ==
- Brorson Elementary School
- Fairview Elementary School/Fairview High School
- Lambert Elementary School/Lambert High School
- Rau Elementary School
- Savage Elementary School/Savage High School
- Sidney Elementary School/Sidney High School

== Roosevelt County ==
- Bainville K-12 Schools
- Brockton Elementary School/Brockton High School
- Culbertson Elementary School/Culbertson High School
- Froid Elementary School/Froid High School
- Frontier Elementary School
- Poplar Elementary School/Poplar High School
- Wolf Point Elementary School/Wolf Point High School

== Rosebud County ==
- Ashland Elementary School
- Colstrip Elementary School/Colstrip High School
- Forsyth K-12 Schools
- Lame Deer K-12 Schools
- Rosebud K-12 Schools

== Sanders County ==
- Dixon Elementary School
- Hot Springs K-12 Schools
- Noxon Elementary School/Noxon High School
- Plains K-12 Schools
- Thompson Falls Elementary School/Thompson Falls High School
- Trout Creek Elementary School

== Sheridan County ==
- Medicine Lake K-12 Schools
- Plentywood K-12 Schools
- Westby K-12 Schools

== Silver Bow County ==
- Butte Elementary School/Butte High School
- Melrose Elementary School
- Ramsay Elementary School

== Stillwater County ==
- Absarokee Elementary School/Absarokee High School
- Columbus Elementary School/Columbus High School
- Molt Elementary School
- Park City Elementary School/Park City High School
- Rapelje Elementary School/Rapelje High School
- Reed Point Elementary School/Reed Point High School

== Sweet Grass County ==
- Big Timber Elementary School
- McLeod Elementary School
- Melville Elementary School
- Sweet Grass County High School

== Teton County ==
- Bynum Elementary School
- Choteau Elementary School/Choteau High School
- Dutton/Brady K-12 Schools
- Fairfield Elementary School/Fairfield High School
- Golden Ridge Elementary School
- Greenfield Elementary School
- Pendroy Elementary School
- Power Elementary School/Power High School

== Toole County ==
- Shelby Elementary School/Shelby High School
- Sunburst K-12 Schools

== Valley County ==
- Frazer Elementary School/Frazer High School
- Glasgow K-12 Schools
- Hinsdale Elementary School/Hinsdale High School
- Lustre Elementary School
- Nashua K-12 Schools
- Opheim K-12 Schools

== Wheatland County ==
- Harlowton Elementary School/Harlowton High School
- Judith Gap Elementary School/Judith Gap High School

== Yellowstone County ==
- Billings Elementary School/Billings High School
- Blue Creek Elementary School
- Broadview Elementary School/Broadview High School
- Canyon Creek Elementary School
- Custer K-12 Schools
- Elder Grove Elementary School
- Elysian Elementary School
- Huntley Project K-12 Schools
- Independent Elementary School
- Laurel Elementary School/Laurel High School
- Lockwood Elementary School
- Morin Elementary School
- Pioneer Elementary School
- Shepherd Elementary School/Shepherd High School
- Yellowstone Academy Elementary School

== Single-District Counties ==
- Anaconda Elementary School/Anaconda High School (Deer Lodge County)
- Hysham K-12 Schools (Treasure County)
- Terry K-12 Schools (Prairie County)
- Townsend K-12 Schools (Broadwater County)
- White Sulphur Springs K-12 Schools (Meagher County)
- Wibaux K-12 Schools
- Winnett K-12 Schools (Petroleum County)
