= Rosebud Battlefield State Park =

- Rosebud Battlefield-Where the Girl Saved Her Brother
- U.S. National Register of Historic Places
- U.S. National Historic Landmark
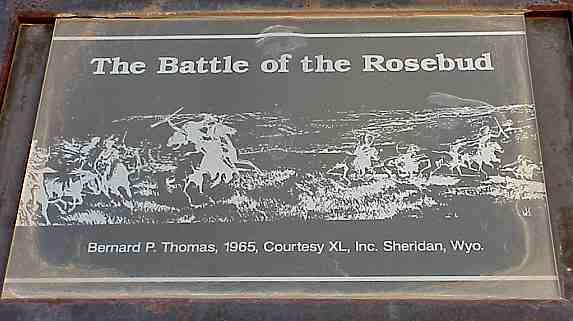
- Site sign, 2003

- Location within Montana Location within the United States
- Location: Big Horn County, Montana
- Nearest city: Busby, Montana
- Coordinates: 45°13′50″N 106°59′52″W
- Area: 4,220 acres (1,710 ha)
- Built: 1876
- Website: Official website
- NRHP reference No.: 72000735

Significant dates
- Added to NRHP: August 21, 1972
- Designated NHL: August 19, 2008

Rosebud Battlefield State Park in Big Horn County, Montana preserves a large portion of the battlefield of the Battle of the Rosebud, fought on June 17, 1876. The battle is known by various other names such as The Battle Where the Girl Saved Her Brother by the Northern Cheyenne, and Crook's Fight on the Rosebud. A National Historic Landmark, the park is a day use facility offering hiking, hunting, picnicking and wildlife viewing. It is located 11 miles (18 km) south of Kirby, Montana on Montana Highway 314.

== Setting ==
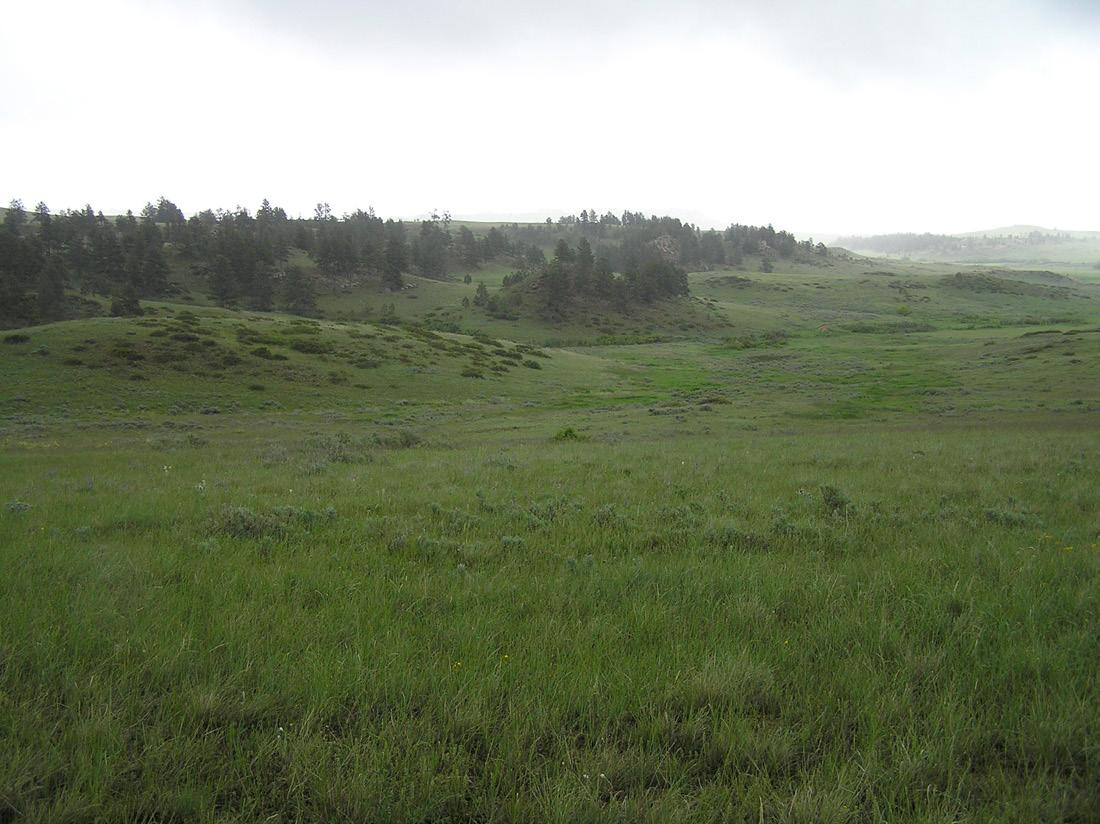
View of the battlefield, undated NPS photo

Rosebud Battlefield State Park is located in a rural setting of Big Horn County, Montana, southeast of Billings and just east of the Northern Cheyenne Indian Reservation. It is located west of Montana Highway 314, in an area of rolling prairie characterized by numerous ridges. Immediately to the south of the battlefield is a mesa, below which Rosebud Creek meanders in a generally easterly direction.

The park has an information kiosk and vault toilet at its entrance, and a rough gravel road traverses around the main battlefield area, but is otherwise undeveloped.

== History ==
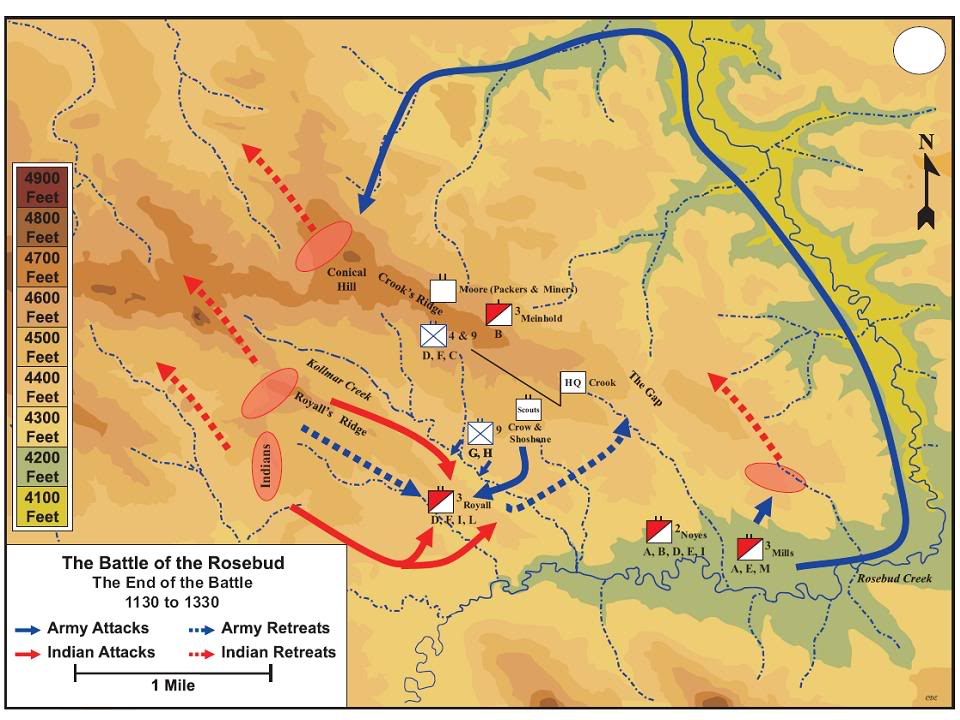
Map showing the battle movements

The Battle of the Rosebud, fought on June 17, 1876, marked a turning point in the Great Sioux War of 1876, in which the United States sought to force Native American tribes in the region onto reservations. United States Army forces under the command of General George Crook were attacked here by a mixed force of Lakota Sioux and Cheyenne commanded by Crazy Horse, stopping an advance that was part of an intended three-pronged movement against Native villages in Bighorn area. Over a six-hour period, the battle extended across a nearly 3-mile (4.8 km) area along Rosebud Creek. It was tactically a stalemate, but Crook failed to make the planned rendezvous and withdrew from the theater of war, ultimately leaving General George Armstrong Custer exposed to defeat at the Battle of the Little Bighorn a week later.

The Cheyenne name for the battlefield, "Where The Girl Saved Her Brother", is derived from an incident during the battle, in which Buffalo Calf Road Woman, a Cheyenne woman, came to the rescue of her brother, Chief Comes in Sight, who was lying wounded on the battlefield. Her act of valor is said to have rallied the Native American forces.

== See also ==
- List of National Historic Landmarks in Montana
- National Register of Historic Places listings in Big Horn County, Montana
