= Kirby, Montana =

Unincorporated community in Montana, United States

Kirby
- unincorporated community
- Location in Montana Kirby (the United States)
- Coordinates: 45°19′57″N 106°58′54″W
- Country: United States
- State: Montana
- County: Big Horn
- Elevation: 3,878 ft (1,182 m)

Population (2010)
  - Total: N/A
- Time zone: UTC-7 (Mountain (MST))
  - Summer (DST): UTC-6 (MDT)
- ZIP code: 59042
- Area code: 406
- GNIS feature ID: 777090

Kirby was an unincorporated community in Big Horn County, Montana, United States. The community location is at an elevation of 3,878 feet (1,182 m). The site is on the west bank of Rosebud Creek. Rosebud Battlefield State Park lies approximately twelve miles south of the community, just west of Rosebud Creek.

== History ==
The town site of Kirby was at Montana Highway 314 and Cache Creek Road. It was directly east of the Crow Indian Reservation and south of the Northern Cheyenne Indian Reservation in the Rosebud Creek valley. A post office was operational from 1895 until 1970 with the ZIP Code of 59042.

Kirby is a ghost town with no more than a couple remaining buildings, including the former post office.
