= Little Wolf =

Native American chief

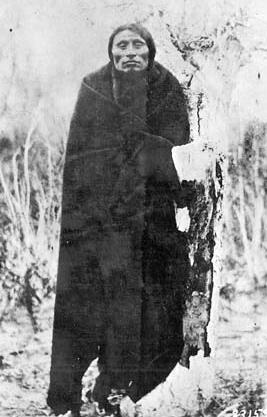
Little Wolf/Little Coyote in Fort Laramie, in May 1868.

Little Wolf (Cheyenne: Ó'kôhómôxháahketa, sometimes transcribed Ohcumgache or Ohkomhakit, more correctly translated Little Coyote, c.1820—1904) was a Northern Só'taeo'o Chief and Sweet Medicine Chief of the Northern Cheyenne. He was known as a great military tactician and led a dramatic escape from confinement in Oklahoma back to the Northern Cheyenne homeland in 1878, known as the Northern Cheyenne Exodus.

== Overview ==
Born in present-day Montana, by the mid-1840s, Little Wolf had become a prominent chieftain of the Northern Cheyenne, leading a group of warriors called the "Elk Horn Scrapers" during the Northern Plains Wars. He fought in Red Cloud's War, the war for the Bozeman Trail, which lasted from 1866 to 1868. As chief, he signed the Treaty of Fort Laramie.

He was chosen one of the "Old Man" chiefs among the Council of Forty-four, a high honor in traditional Cheyenne culture. He was also chosen as Sweet Medicine Chief, bearer of the spiritual incarnation of Sweet Medicine, a primary culture hero and spiritual ancestor of the Cheyenne. Because of this honorary title, he was expected to be above anger, as well as concerned only for his people and not for himself.

== Battles ==
He was not present at the Battle of the Little Bighorn, but played a part before and after the battle. Some scouts from his camp apparently found some food left behind by Custer's attack force, and were observed by U.S. military scouts. This fact was reported to Custer, who incorrectly assumed he had been discovered by the main camp of Sioux and Cheyenne on the Little Bighorn, and urgently pressed on with his attack, trying to prevent the escape of the Indians. After the battle, Little Wolf arrived and was detained and almost killed by the angry Sioux, who suspected he was scouting for the whites. Only his fierce denial of complicity in the attack and the support of his fellow Northern Cheyenne present during the fighting saved him from harm.

== Defeat and exile ==
In November 1876, the bands of Little Wolf and Dull Knife camped on the Red Fork of the Powder River in Wyoming Territory. In the early morning of November 25, units of the Second, Third, and Fifth U.S. Cavalry commanded by Colonel Ranald S. Mackenzie attacked the Cheyenne; Little Wolf and Dull Knife surrendered. A few months later, the Bureau of Indian Affairs forced Little Wolf, Dull Knife, and their people to the Darlington Agency in Indian Territory in 1877.

== Escape from Indian Territory ==
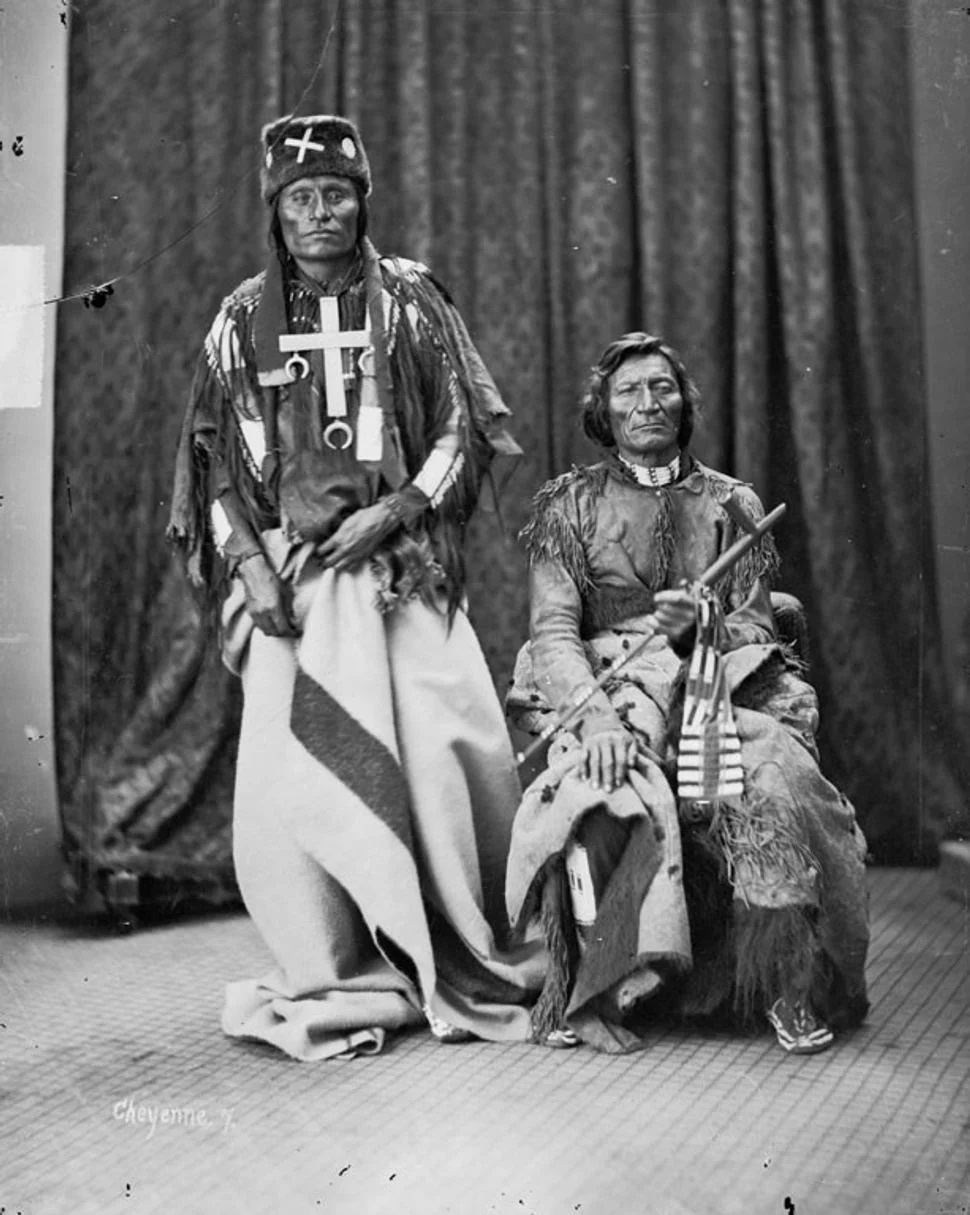
Little Coyote (Little Wolf) and Morning Star (Dull Knife), Chiefs of the Northern Cheyennes

Following the defeat of Dull Knife and Little Wolf by Col. Ranald S. Mackenzie at the Dull Knife Fight in November 1876, Little Wolf and Dull Knife surrendered. They were forced onto a reservation in Oklahoma's Indian Territory. The Northern Cheyennes found life at Darlington Agency intolerable. Malaria and other diseases plagued them, and the agency failed to provide sufficient medical supplies, beef rations, or winter clothing. Forty-one people died that winter. Little Wolf and Dull Knife requested permission to return with their people to Montana, but agent John DeBras Miles and the Indian Bureau repeatedly denied their requests. In September 1878, Little Wolf and Dull Knife led almost 300 Cheyenne from their reservation near Fort Reno, Oklahoma, through Kansas, Nebraska, and the Dakota Territory into the Montana Territory, their ancestral home.

During the journey, they managed to elude the U.S. cavalry units which were trying to capture them. The two groups split up after reaching Nebraska, and while Dull Knife's party was eventually forced to surrender near Fort Robinson, those in Little Wolf's group made their way to Montana where they were finally allowed to remain.

== Later life ==
Little Wolf would later become a scout for the U.S. Army under Gen. Nelson A. Miles. He was involved in a dispute which resulted in the death of Starving Elk. Little Wolf was intoxicated when he shot and killed him at the trading post of Eugene Lamphere on December 12, 1880. Little Wolf went into voluntary exile as a result of this disgrace. His status as a chief was revoked.

In his later years, he lived on the Northern Cheyenne Indian Reservation, where he died in 1904. He is interred in the Lame Deer cemetery, alongside the gravesite of Morning Star. George Bird Grinnell, a close friend and ethnographer who documented Little Wolf's life, called him, "the greatest Indian I have ever known."

== Timeline ==
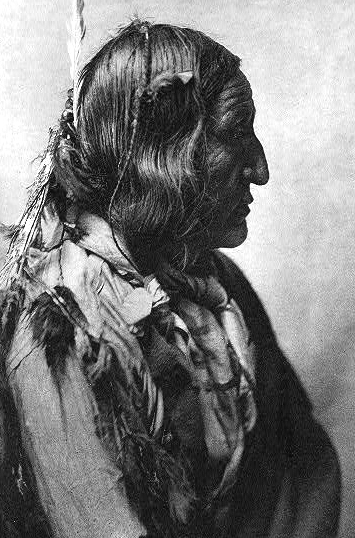
Laban Little Wolf, a nephew of Little Wolf, by Edward Sheriff Curtis

=== Little Wolf ===
- 1820 Birth
- 1856 Involved in the affair of the 'stolen' horse at the Platte Bridge
- 1866 Takes part in the Fetterman Fight
- 1868 Signs a treaty with the U.S. Government at Fort Laramie
- 1868 Burns Fort Phil Kearny
- 1873 Visits Washington, D.C.
- 1876 Takes part in the Dull Knife Fight
- 1877 Ordered to go south to confinement in Oklahoma
- 1878 Leads dramatic escape from reservation and returns to Montana
- 1879 Scouts for the U.S. military
- 1880 Kills Starving Elk; removed as Chief; goes into voluntary exile
- 1904 Death

=== Cheyenne Timeline ===
- 17th-18th century: Migrated from Minnesota to North Dakota
- 1804: Visited by the Lewis and Clark Expedition
- 1851: Ft. Laramie Treaty
- 1859: Colorado Gold Rush
- 1864: Colorado War
- 1864: November, Sand Creek massacre
- 1868: Battle of Washita River
- 1876: Battle of the Little Bighorn
- 1877: Moved to Indian Territory
- 1884: New reservation established near the Black Hills

== Errata ==
"Little Wolf" is a fairly common name among American Indians. More than one Cheyenne chief bore the name, an early example being a Southern Cheyenne chief who participated in a famous horse-stealing raid (c. 1830) on the Comanches with Yellow Wolf.

== See also ==
- Eugene Little Coyote
- Marie Sanchez - a direct descendant of Little Wolf.

== Notes ==
- Fisher, Louise; Wayne Leman, Leroy Pine Sr., Marie Sanchez (2006) Cheyenne Dictionary. Lame Deer, Montana: Chief Dull Knife College
- Britannica Student Encyclopedia
