= Wolf Mountains =

Mountain range in Big Horn County, Montana, United States

Highest point
- Elevation: 4,842 ft (1,476 m)
- Coordinates: 45°11′46″N 107°08′27″W

Naming
- Native name: Cheétiish (Crow)

Geography
- Country: United States
- State: Montana

The Wolf Mountains (Crow: Cheétiish), el. 4,842 feet (1,476 m), sometimes referred to by local people as the Rosebud Mountains, and also known to the Crow Native Americans as the Wolf Teeth Mountains, are a mountain range east of Lodge Grass, Montana in Big Horn County, Montana.

== Geography ==
The mountain chain is in the southeastern portion of Big Horn County in Montana, and also is on the southeastern border of the Crow Indian Reservations.

The mountains lie on a north–south axis. The mountain range rises just south of the Reno Creek (aka Sundance Creek) and Davis Creek divide which flow respectively into the Little Bighorn River on the west and Rosebud Creek to the east, and extends south for about 35 miles to the Montana/Wyoming border area. The northern half of the range has creeks draining into Rosebud Creek on the east, and creeks draining into the Little Bighorn River to the west. The southern half of the range has creeks running into Pass Creek on the west (a tributary of the Little Bighorn River), and creeks running into the Tongue River on the east.

== Historical Associations ==
In the Great Sioux War of 1876 on June 17, 1876, a force of Lakota Sioux and Northern Cheyenne warriors riding some 20 miles down the Wolf Mountains from Reno Creek (aka Sundance Creek) attacked General George Crook's army command at the Battle of the Rosebud at a site on the upper Rosebud Creek drainage in the southern half of the Wolf Mountains.

Also in the Great Sioux War of 1876 the Davis Creek/Reno Creek Divide just at the northern border of the Wolf Mountain Range was the route along which the large Lakota Sioux/Northern Cheyenne encampment moved from Rosebud Creek to the Little Bighorn River on about June 15, 1876 leaving a trail followed later by Colonel George A. Custer leading 7th Cavalry on June 24–25, 1876 just prior to the Battle of the Little Bighorn. On the early morning hours of June 25, 1876 Crow Scouts with the 7th Cavalry ascended to a high point (now known as the Crow's Nest) in the Wolf Mountains south of the Davis Creek/Reno Creek divide, and looking toward the Little Bighorn Valley saw indications of the large Lakota Sioux/Northern Cheyenne village which Custer and the 7th Cavalry then attacked later that same day, in the Battle of the Little Bighorn.

== See also ==
- List of mountain ranges in Montana
