= Marie Sanchez =

Chief Judge of the Northern Cheyenne Tribe (1939–2019)

Marie Elena Brady Sanchez
- Otséóhtsé'e
- Born: Juanita Marie Brady; April 30, 1939; Lame Deer, Montana, U.S.
- Died: August 9, 2019 (aged 80); Billings, Montana, U.S.
- Citizenship: Northern Cheyenne Tribe, American
- Occupations: Chief Judge of Northern Cheyenne Tribe; Human rights defender; Linguist
- Years active: 1970–2019
- Partner: Charles T. Sanchez Sr.
- Children: 8
- Parents: James Brady (father); Mary Alice Woodenthigh (mother)

Marie Elena Brady Sanchez (Cheyenne: Otséóhtsé'e, born Juanita Marie Brady; April 30, 1939 – August 9, 2019) was an American Cheyenne, Chief Judge of the Northern Cheyenne Tribe, a human rights activist for indigenous people and a linguist.

== Early life ==
Marie Sanchez was born as Juanita Marie Brady on April 30, 1939, in Lame Deer, Montana. Her Cheyenne name is Otseohtse’e. Her father was James Brady and her mother was Mary Alice Woodenthigh. She was a direct descendent of Chief Little Wolf from her mother's side. Her great-grandfather Hugh Woodenthigh was the son of Chief Little Wolf of the Northern Cheyenne. On September 13, 1942, she was baptized at St. Labre Parish as Marie Elena Brady.

== Career ==
Throughout her life she was an advocate for indigenous people's rights and the Cheyenne language. She was a Chief Judge of the Northern Cheyenne Tribe in Montana and a teacher at Montana State University and at Chief Dull Knife College. She was also a linguist and a contributor to the Cheyenne Dictionary by Wayne Leman.

As a human rights defender she was an active member of the International Indian Treaty Council, NOW and the Elk Horn Scrapers. She was a board member of the National Board of Research on the Plutonium Economy, the Native American Student Council (NASC) and the Native American Solidarity Committee. In the 1970s, she protested against some sterilization procedures for tribal members in the 1970s that were performed in reservation hospitals and off-reservation hospitals contracted by the federal government.

In 1974, she was a co-founder of Women of All Red Nations (WARN) and soon thereafter a member of the advisory board of the National Women's Health Network.

On December 8, 1976, she appeared on the PBS Newshour show The MacNeil/Lehrer Report with Robert MacNeil and Jim Lehrer. They discussed involuntary sterilization on the reservation and in Lame Deer, Montana. The reservation only had 2,400 people in 1976.

On April 15, 1977 she appeared on the television show called Woman of WNED-TV and discussed in-depth the concerns of American Indian women.

In 1977 she gained fame as a speaker at the Conference on Indians in the Americas of the United Nations in Geneva. She discussed the preservation of native American culture and languages, sovereignty and the rights of Indigenous women. During the conference she mentioned the Family Planning Services and Population Research Act of 1970 which was enacted by the Nixon administration. In a span of six years it resulted in circa 25% involuntary sterilization of Native American women and has been described as a modern genocide. Sanchez argued that it was one of many injustices committed against indigenous people through American history, such as the forced displacement and relocation of native Americans to reservations, which caused health disasters in the nineteenth century. By the late 1970s Sanchez and others' activism enabled some improvement of federal regulations to reduce unwanted sterilization procedures.

== Personal life ==
She was married to Charles T. Sanchez Sr. and had eight children. She died at 80 years old on August 9, 2019.
