= Northern Cheyenne Tribal School =

K-12 school in Montana, USA

Coordinates: 45.5364°N 106.9572°W

- Busby, Big Horn County, Montana; United States

Information
- Grades: K-12
- Affiliation: Bureau of Indian Education

Northern Cheyenne Tribal School (NCTS) is a tribally controlled K-12 school in Busby, Montana. It is affiliated with the Bureau of Indian Education (BIE).

It is on the Northern Cheyenne Indian Reservation and it is one of two tribally controlled schools in the state with grade levels K-12.

== History ==
Previously the BIE directly operated the school and had boarding facilities, but the tribe later took management of the school and boarding ended.

In 2010 it had about 24 teachers. According to an anonymous teacher who corresponded with Matt Volz of the Associated Press, almost all teachers were told that they would have to apply again for their positions as their contracts were not renewed. According to the teacher, seven of them were told that they should not reapply for their jobs while fourteen were either told they could reapply and/or already had their jobs renewed. According to a teacher quoted in Volz's article, this was done as some teachers had complained about Elberta Monroe, the principal and superintendent.

On February 11, 2010, the board fired Monroe, but on February 15 the tribal council suspended the firing so it could review the situation. Monroe remained on the school property and resisted being removed from her position. On Monday February 22, the school board voted to fire Monroe again. In response the tribal council dissolved the school board.
