= Eva Flying =

- Võestaā'e

6th President of Chief Dull Knife College
- Incumbent
- Assumed office October 2022
- Preceded by: Richard Littlebear

Personal details
- Citizenship: Northern Cheyenne Tribe; United States
- Children: 1
- Education: Sheridan College (A.A.); Fort Lewis College (B.A.); Montana State University Billings (M.S.)

Eva M. Flying (Cheyenne: Võestaā'e) is an American academic administrator and health advocate who serves as the president of Chief Dull Knife College. A member of the Northern Cheyenne Tribe, she became the first woman to lead the college upon her appointment in 2022. Flying has a background in health and wellness program management and was appointed to the board of trustees for the American Indian College Fund in 2025.

== Early life and education ==
Flying is a member of the Northern Cheyenne Tribe. Her Cheyenne name, Võestaā'e, translates to "White Buffalo Calf Woman" and was given to her by her grandfather, Grover Wolfvoice. Her father is John Paul Flying Sr. (Northern Cheyenne), and her mother is Beverly Jordan Flying (Oneida). Her paternal grandparents were Lawrence Flying (Turkey-Legs) and Eva Ghost Bull, while her maternal grandparents were Melvin Jordan and Gertrude King. She has two siblings, John Flying and Matthew Flying.

Raised on the Northern Cheyenne Indian Reservation, Flying attended Lame Deer Public School for her elementary education and completed her secondary education at Colstrip High School. Flying earned an Associate of Arts in general studies at Sheridan College. She played collegiate basketball at both Casper College and Sheridan College. She also played basketball at the semi-professional level.

Flying continued her studies at Fort Lewis College, graduating with a B.A. in exercise science. In 1999, she earned a M.S. in sports administration from Montana State University Billings. During her graduate studies, she completed an internship at the University of North Carolina at Chapel Hill. Later in her career, Flying began a Ed.D. degree with a focus on community colleges at California State University, Stanislaus. As of 2025, she is completing a Ph.D. in Education Leadership at Montana State University.

== Career ==
In 2009, Flying headed the Health and Wellness Program at the Institute of American Indian Arts (IAIA), where she oversaw courses ranging from yoga and nutrition to self-defense. During this time, the program also developed student groups specifically for young Native women's empowerment and wellness awareness. She advocated for the view that health and wellness are integral to student learning and success. Flying has operated her own personal training consulting business.

Since 2009, Flying has served on the Athletic Commission of the American Indian Higher Education Consortium (AIHEC).

In the fall of 2022, Flying succeeded Richard Littlebear to become the sixth president of Chief Dull Knife College (CDKC). Her appointment marked the first time a woman held the presidency in the college's history. Upon assuming the role, she prioritized the revitalization of the college's athletic department, reestablishing the men's and women's basketball programs after they had been on hiatus for five years. Under her administration, the CDKC women's basketball team won the AIHEC championship in 2023, the team's first title in nearly 40 years.

In September 2025, Flying was appointed to a three-year term on the board of trustees for the American Indian College Fund.

== Personal life ==
Flying has a son.
