= Forty Mile Colony, Montana =

- Census-designated place
- Location within Montana Location within the United States
- Coordinates: 45°16′56″N 107°21′22″W
- Country: United States
- State: Montana
- County: Big Horn

Area
  - Total: 0.19 sq mi (0.50 km^{2})
  - Land: 0.19 sq mi (0.50 km^{2})
  - Water: 0 sq mi (0.00 km^{2})
- Elevation: 3,438 ft (1,048 m)

Population (2020)
  - Total: 28
  - Density: 146.4/sq mi (56.54/km^{2})
- Time zone: UTC-7 (Mountain (MST))
  - Summer (DST): UTC-6 (MDT)
- ZIP Code: 59050 (Lodge Grass)
- Area code: 406
- FIPS code: 30-28725
- GNIS feature ID: 2806613

Forty Mile Colony is a Hutterite colony and census-designated place (CDP) in Big Horn County, Montana, United States, within the Crow Indian Reservation. It is in the valley of the Little Bighorn River, 3 miles (5 km) south of the town of Lodge Grass. As of the 2020 census, Forty Mile Colony had a population of 28.

The location was first listed as a CDP prior to the 2020 census.

== Demographics ==
Historical population
Census	Pop.	Note	%±
2020	28		—
U.S. Decennial Census
