= Burying the hatchet =

American English idiom meaning "to make peace"

"Bury the hatchet" is a North American English idiom meaning "to make peace". The phrase is an allusion to the figurative or literal practice of putting away weapons at the cessation of hostilities among or by Indigenous peoples of the Americas in the Eastern United States and Canada. It specifically concerns the formation of the Haudenosaunee Confederacy. Weapons were to be buried or otherwise cached in time of peace. Europeans first became aware of such a ceremony in 1644:

"A translation of Thwaites' monumental work Jesuit Relations, 1644, suggests the practice: "Proclaim that they wish to unite all the nations of the earth and to hurl the hatchet so far into the depths of the earth that it shall never again be seen in the future."

The practice existed long before European settlement of the Americas; the phrase emerged in English by the 17th century.

== Massachusetts ==
An early mention of the practice is to an actual hatchet-burying ceremony. Samuel Sewall wrote in 1680 "of the Mischief the Mohawks did; which occasioned Major Pynchon's going to Albany, where meeting with the Sachem they came to an agreement and buried two Axes in the Ground; one for English another for themselves; which ceremony to them is more significant & binding than all Articles of Peace the hatchet being a principal weapon with them."

== South Carolina ==
The Treaty of Hopewell, signed by Col. Benjamin Hawkins, Gen. Andrew Pickens and Headman McIntosh, in Keowee, South Carolina in 1795 established the boundary of the Cherokee Nation, and made use of the phrase "bury the hatchet". Article 11 reads, "The hatchet shall be forever buried, and the peace given by the United States, and friendship re-established between the said states on the one part, and all the Cherokees on the other, shall be universal; and the contracting parties shall use their utmost endeavors to maintain the peace given as aforesaid, and friendship re-established."

== Nova Scotia ==
The Burying the Hatchet ceremony happened in Nova Scotia on June 25, 1761. It ended more than seventy-five years of war between the British and the Mi'kmaq.

== Montana ==
Exactly 50 years after the Battle of Little Bighorn, in 1926, Sioux Indian Chief White Bull and General Edward Settle Godfrey buried the hatchet at the Tomb of the Unknown Soldier in Garryowen, Montana. It was near this site that Custer divided his forces and began his attack against the Sioux, Arapahoe and Cheyenne that were camped within the Valley of the Little Bighorn.

== Quebec ==
The phrase was used in 1759 by the Shawnee orator Missiweakiwa when it became obvious that the French war effort during the Seven Years' War (French and Indian War) was collapsing. The Shawnees had sided with the French against the English, but now the Shawnee would "bury the bloody Hatchet" with the English.

== Delaware ==
At the Return Day festival in Georgetown, Delaware, which occurs after each Election Day, a "burying of the hatchet" ceremony is performed by the Sussex County chairs of the Democratic and Republican parties. The ceremony symbolizes the two parties making peace after the election and moving on.

== Texas ==
The first record of a peace ceremony in San Antonio, Texas was in 1749 between the Spanish commander of the presidio Captain Toribio de Urrutia, Fray Santa Ana and the Lipan Apache people.
