= Belle Highwalking =

American Indian writer (1892–1971)

- Ésevonemé'ėhné'e
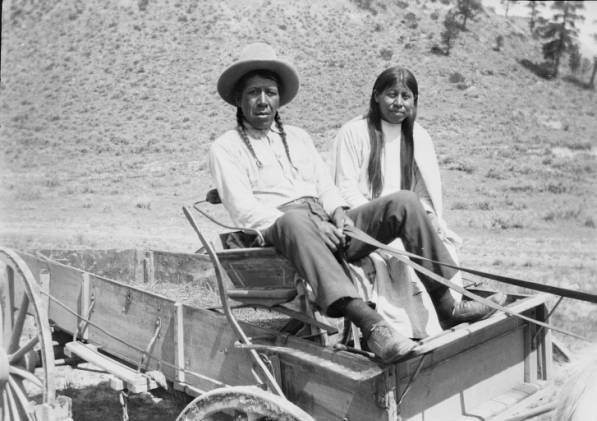
- Floyd and Belle Highwalking - undated and anonymous
- Born: 1892 prob. Northern Cheyenne Indian Reservation
- Died: October 30, 1971 (aged 78–79)
- Writing career
- Genre: Autobiography
- Notable work: “Belle Highwalking: The Narrative of a Northern Cheyenne Woman.

Belle Highwalking (Cheyenne: Ésevonemé'ėhné'e; 1892 – 1971) was an American Indian writer who lived on the Northern Cheyenne Indian Reservation in Montana. She is known because of a biography recorded in English and Cheyenne, which was edited and published after her death in 1979.

== Life ==
Highwalking's father was Charles Teeth. Her mother died when she was born in 1892. She survived because her grandmother cared for her and she took her to other nursing mothers to feed her until she was weaned. She was taught by her uncle who taught at Busby School. She lived on the Northern Cheyenne Indian Reservation in Montana. She and Floyd Highwalking were arrested for living together without being (legally) married, and they married in a Catholic church in 1912. She took a brief interest in the church and she took advantage of lessons that allowed her to read the bible which was available in Cheyenne. Her in-law's adopted her as they felt sorry for her because she had grown up without her mother. Her mother-in-law would cut up her food and feed her as a gift and her father-in-law cautioned his family that they should never criticize her.

Her husband was not educated, but he was known for keeping cattle, which was unusual where they lived. She had inherited horses from her mother.

Her approach to life was notable for the gifts that she gave in the tradition of her heritage. In the 1920s she had visited the Crow reservation where she learned about a "giveaway" where people would celebrate events by giving away valuables.

Floyd died in 1964 and in her tradition she gave away gifts that covered seven tables.

In around 1970 she dictated her biography in English and in Cheyenne, with details about her childhood and Indian ceremonies to Kiene M. Weist. The resulting tapes in Cheyenne were translated by her niece so that in 1979 her biography could be published, as "Belle Highwalking, the narrative of a North Cheyenne woman". She died on 30 October 1971 while living with her eldest son, George Hiwalker.

== Private life ==
Highwalking had a single marriage and they had several children over a span of fifteen years.
