= Eugene Little Coyote =

American politician

Eugene Little Coyote (Cheyenne: Méona'hāne) was the president of the Northern Cheyenne Indian Reservation from 2004 to 2007. He was elected in November 2004, defeating the incumbent president, Geri Small. However, after a conflict with reservation vice president Rick Wolfname that began in July 2007 escalated, the Northern Cheyenne tribal council declared that it would oust Little Coyote as the tribe's president. Little Coyote was forcibly removed from office and arrested for trespassing in the tribal office building on December 28, 2007. The move by the tribal council to remove Little Coyote from office was deemed unconstitutional and void by the Northern Cheyenne Constitutional Court. The Constitutional Court was however overruled by Bureau of Indian Affairs' regional director Ed Parisian, and later the Assistant Secretary for Indian Affairs Carl J. Artman. Their involvement in this matter set a historical precedence of the BIA directly meddling with tribal governments.

Little Coyote was also a write-in candidate for April 2008 election and a candidate for the September 30, 2008 primary election.

On August 14, 2008, a jury trial found Little Coyote not guilty on charges of criminal mischief based on the events from December 28, 2007. The jury verdict was unanimous.

| Preceded by Geri Small | Northern Cheyenne Tribal Council President; November 2004–December 2007 | Succeeded by Rick Wolfname (interim president) |
