= Quietus, Montana =

Unincorporated community in the United States

Quietus
- unincorporated community
- Location in Montana Quietus (the United States)
- Coordinates: 45°05′47″N 106°16′59″W
- Country: United States
- State: Montana
- County: Big Horn
- Elevation: 4,072 ft (1,241 m)

Population (2010)
  - Total: 0
- Time zone: UTC-7 (Mountain (MST))
  - Summer (DST): UTC-6 (MDT)
- ZIP code: 59027
- Area code: 406
- GNIS feature ID: 775514

Quietus is the site of a former town, centered on a post office now closed, and a community in the surrounding area. It was located in Big Horn County, Montana, United States. The surrounding area is now an unincorporated community.

== History ==
Quietus was established as a post office in 1907 to service homesteaders and ranchers living in the valleys of the Otter and Quietus Creeks. Though never a large community, the local population eventually dwindled to less than a dozen residents, until the post office closed in 1957. Today, Quietus is a "ghost town," the loop road and the post office building remains, though it has collapsed.

== Etymology ==
According to local anecdote Frank Brittain sent a list of fifteen names with the town's application for a post office in 1914, and all of them were rejected. "Well, I guess they put a quietus on that," Brittain said to his wife. She saw the opportunity, and renewed the application, and a few weeks later the name Quietus was approved.
