= Rosebud Creek (Montana) =

Stream in Rosebud and Big Horn counties, Montana, United States

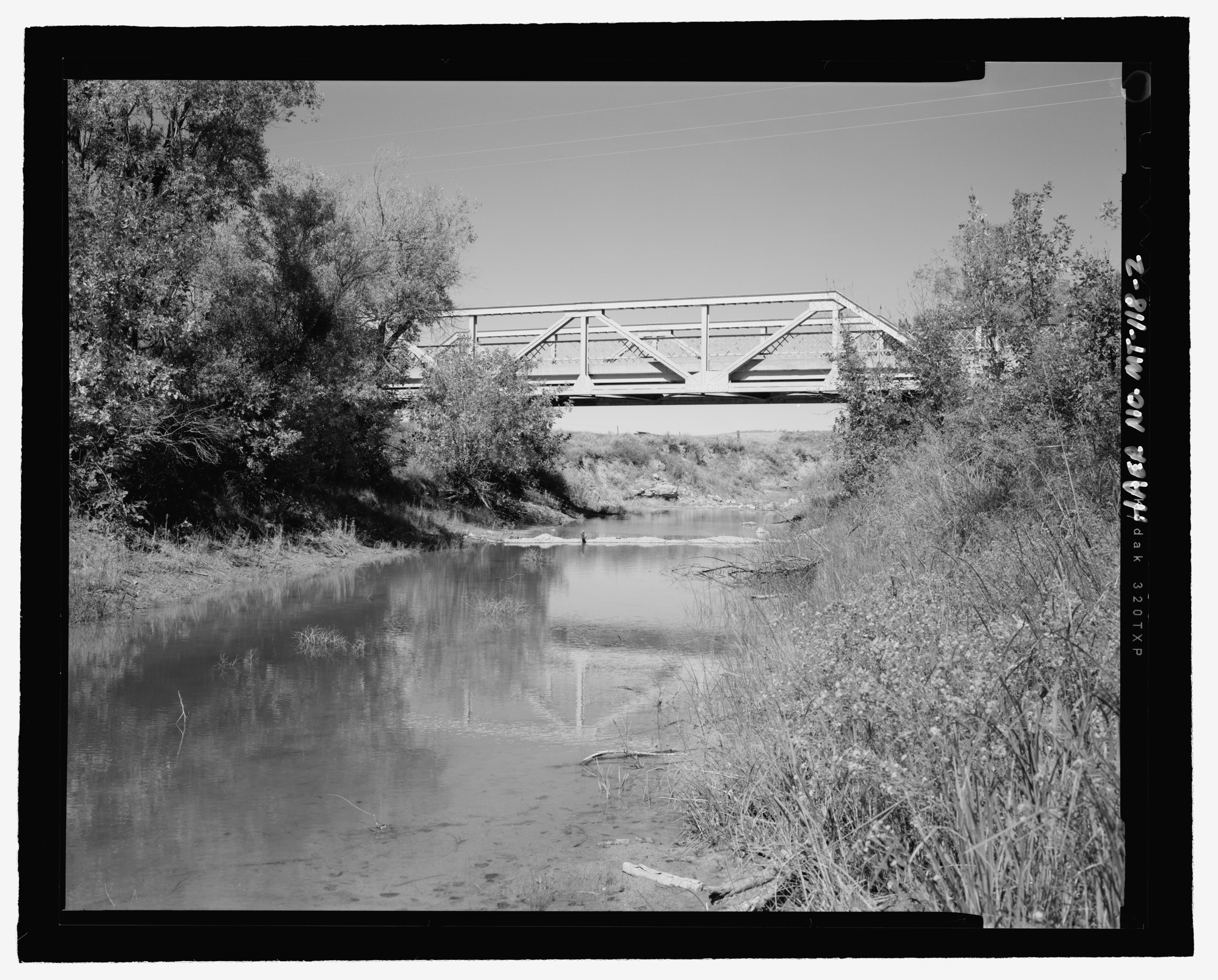
- Native name: Henenéo'hé'e (Cheyenne)

Location
- Country: United States
- State: Montana
- County: Rosebud and Big Horn counties

Physical characteristics
- Source: Confluence of North Fork Rosebud Creek and South Fork Rosebud Creek
  - location: Big Horn County
  - coordinates: 45°12′48″N 107°00′07″W
  - elevation: 4315 ft.
- Mouth: Confluence with the Yellowstone River
  - location: Rosebud County
  - coordinates: 46°16′23″N 106°28′35″W
  - elevation: 2480 ft.

Rosebud Creek (Cheyenne: Henenéo'hé'e) is a generally north flowing stream in Rosebud and Big Horn counties of Montana. It is a tributary to the Yellowstone River.

The source is the confluence of the North and South forks about one mile east of the Crow Indian Reservation boundary. The two forks both flow east from the east flank of the Wolf Mountains.

The confluence with the Yellowstone River is about 1.5 miles west of the community of Rosebud.

Monument Hill, the site of the Rosebud Battlefield lies about one mile north of the source area of the stream. The site is currently the location of the Rosebud Battlefield State Park.
