= Battle of the Rosebud =

1876 battle between the US and Native American tribes

Coordinates: 45°13′23″N 106°59′52″W

- Part of the Great Sioux War of 1876
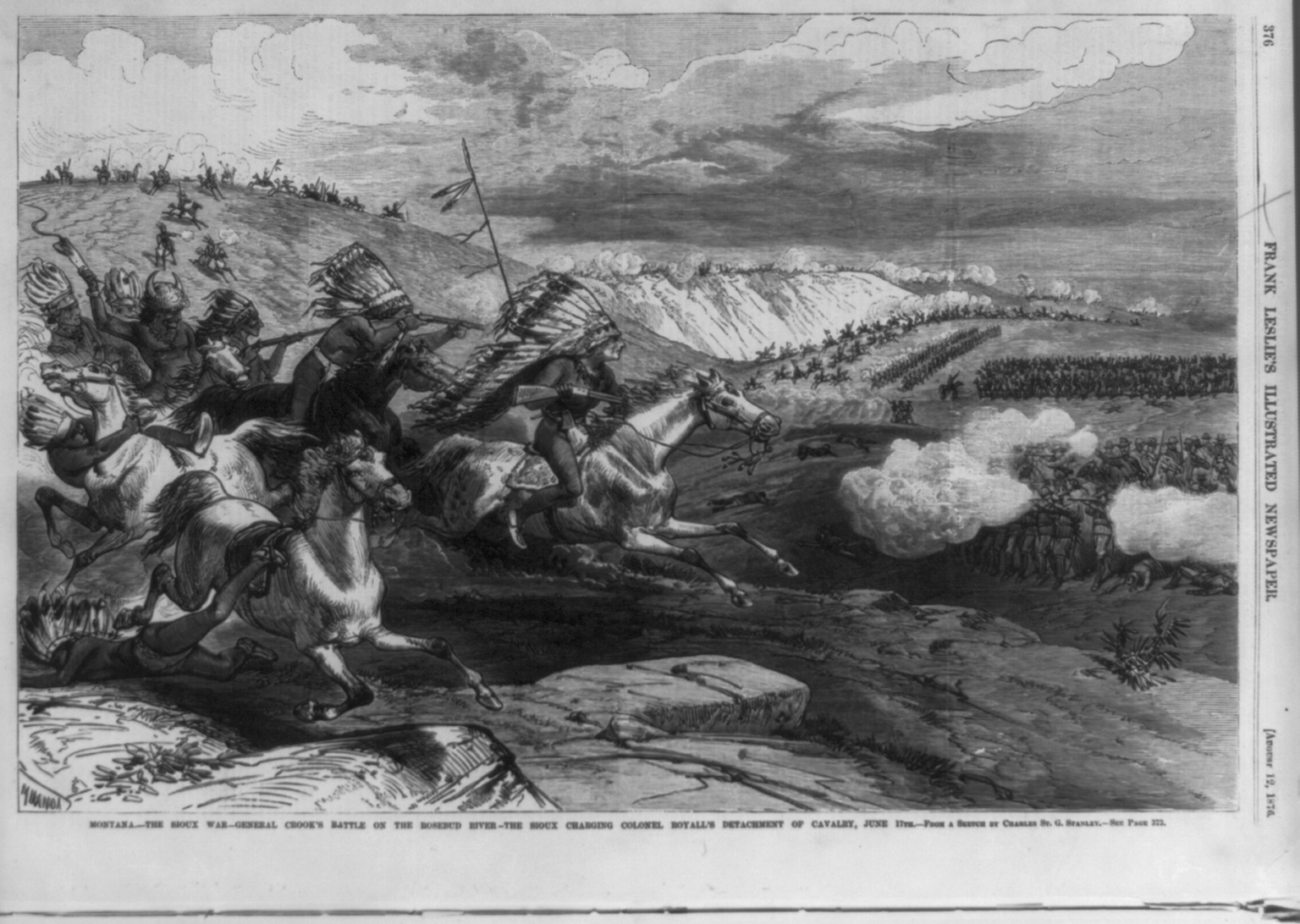
- "Battle on the Rosebud Creek", 1876
Date	June 17, 1876
Location	Big Horn County, Montana
Result	Lakota and Cheyenne victory

Belligerents
Lakota Sioux; Northern Cheyenne Northern Arapaho	United States; Crow; Shoshoni

Commanders and leaders
Crazy Horse	(United States) George Crook; Plenty Coups (Crow); Washakie (Shoshoni)

Strength
~1,000–1,800	~950 soldiers 175 Crow; 86 Shoshoni; ~100 armed civilians Total: 1311 men

Casualties and losses
13–36 killed 63–100 wounded	U.S.: 14–28 killed; 43–46 wounded Crow Scouts: 1–5 killed Shoshoni Scouts: 1–8 killed

The Battle of the Rosebud or the Battle of Rosebud Creek took place on June 17, 1876, in the Montana Territory between the United States Army and its Crow and Shoshoni allies against a force consisting primarily of Lakota Sioux and Northern Cheyenne Indians during the Great Sioux War of 1876. The Cheyenne called it the Battle Where the Girl Saved Her Brother because of an incident during the fight involving Buffalo Calf Road Woman. General George Crook's offensive was stymied by the Indians, led by Crazy Horse, and he awaited reinforcements before resuming the campaign in August.

== Background ==
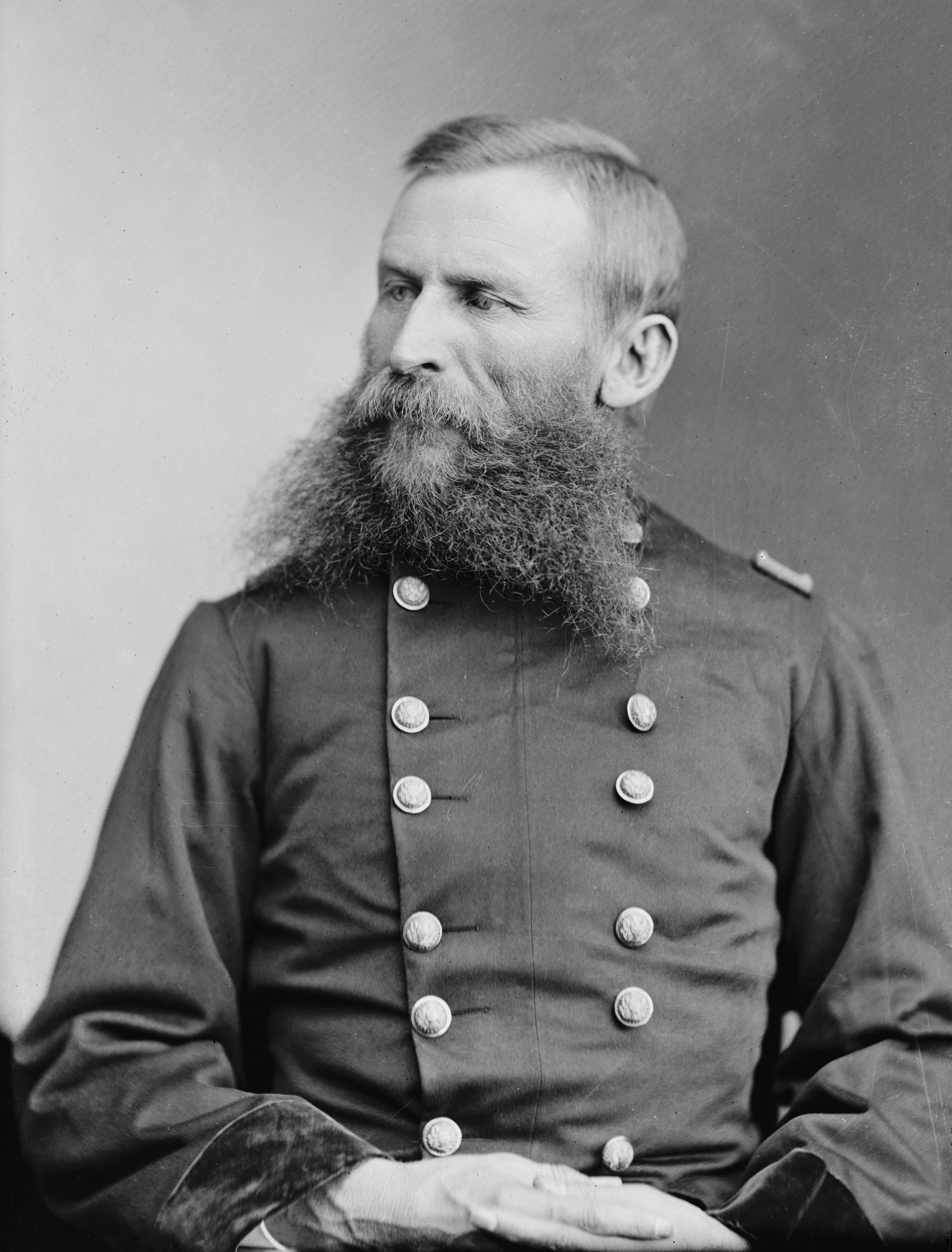
General George Crook

After their victory in Red Cloud's War and with the signing of the Treaty of Fort Laramie (1868), the Lakota and their Northern Cheyenne allies were allocated a reservation including the Black Hills, in Dakota Territory and a large area of unceded territory in what became Montana and Wyoming. Both areas were for the exclusive use of the Indians, and non-Indians (except for US government officials) were forbidden to trespass. In 1874, the discovery of gold in the Black Hills caused the US government to attempt to buy the Black Hills from the Indians. The US ordered all bands of Lakota and Cheyenne to come to the agencies on the reservation by January 31, 1876, to negotiate the sale. A few bands did not comply and when the deadline of January 31 passed the US forced Sitting Bull, Crazy Horse, and their followers onto the reservation. The first military expedition against the Indians in March 1876 was a failure, ending in the Battle of Powder River.

In June 1876, the US military renewed the fight with a three-pronged invasion of the Bighorn and Powder river country. Colonel John Gibbon led a force from the west; General Alfred Terry (with Lieutenant Colonel George Armstrong Custer) came from the east; and General George Crook advanced northward from Fort Fetterman, near present-day Douglas, Wyoming. The objective of the converging columns was to find the Indians and force them onto the reservation. Crook's force, called the Bighorn and Yellowstone Expedition, consisted of 993 cavalry and mule-mounted infantry, 197 civilian packers and teamsters, 65 Montana miners, three scouts, and five journalists. Crook's much-valued chief scout was Frank Grouard. Among the teamsters was Calamity Jane, disguised as a man.

Crook left Fort Fetterman on the abandoned Bozeman Trail past the scene of many battles during Red Cloud's War ten years earlier. His force reached the Tongue River near present-day Sheridan, Wyoming on June 8. Crazy Horse warned that he would fight if "Three Stars" [Crook] crossed the Tongue and on June 9 the Indians launched a long-distance attack, firing into the soldier's camp and wounding two men. Crook and his men waited near the Tongue for several days for Crow and Shoshoni warriors to join his army. 175 Crow and 86 Shoshoni showed up on June 14 with Frank Grouard. They welcomed the opportunity to strike a blow against their old enemies although they warned Crook that the Lakota and Cheyenne were as "numerous as grass." The Shoshoni and Crow were well-armed. Crook had made his reputation as an Indian fighter "using Indians to catch Indians" and the Crow and Shoshoni warriors were important to him.

On June 16, leaving his wagon and pack train behind with most of the civilians as a guard, Crook and the soldiers, with the Crow and Shoshoni in the lead, advanced northward beyond the Tongue to the headwaters of Rosebud Creek to search for and engage the Lakota and Cheyenne. Each soldier carried four days' rations and 100 rounds of ammunition. Crook's intention to make a quiet march was spoiled when the Crow and Shoshoni encountered a buffalo herd and shot many of them. Crook anticipated that he would soon find a large Indian village on Rosebud Creek to attack, but the Indian village was on Ash Creek, west of Rosebud Creek. Crook also underestimated the determination of his foe. He anticipated the usual Indian tactics of hit-and-run encounters and ambushes, not a pitched battle.

The Indian force of almost 1,000 men set out from their village on June 16 in the middle of the night to seek out the soldiers on the Rosebud. They rode all night, rested their horses for a couple of hours, then continued, making contact with Crook's scouts at about 8:30 am, June 17.

== Attack on the Rosebud ==
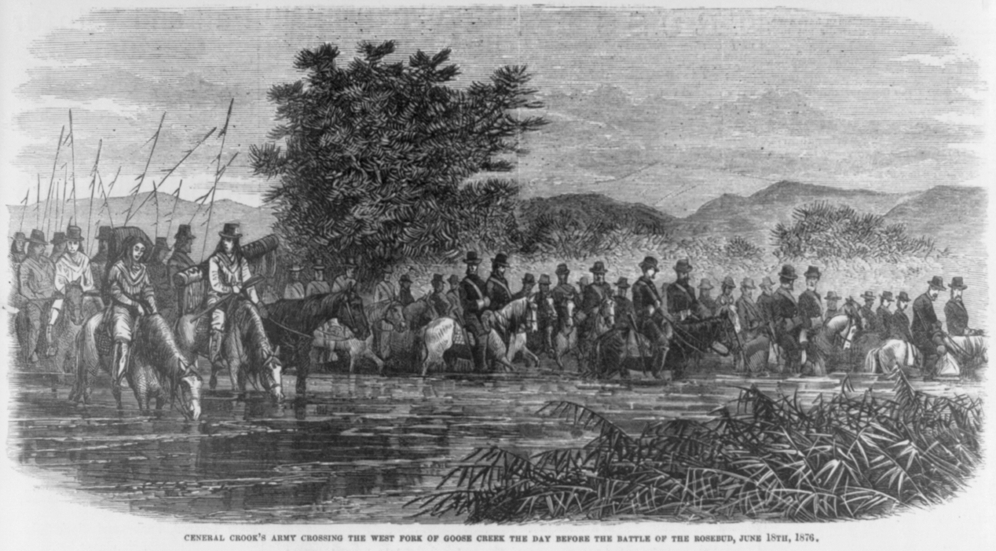
General Crook's Army crossing the west fork of Goose Creek the day before the Battle of the Rosebud

On June 17, 1876, Crook's column marched northward along the south fork of Rosebud Creek. The holiday atmosphere that prevailed since the arrival of the Indian scouts on June 15 was suddenly absent. The soldiers, particularly the mule-riding infantry, were fatigued from the previous day's 35 miles (56 km) march and the early morning reveille at 3:00 am. At 8 am, Crook stopped to rest his men and animals. Although deep in hostile territory, Crook made no special dispositions for defense. His troops halted in their marching order. The Crow and Shoshoni scouts remained alert while the soldiers rested. Soldiers in camp began to hear gunfire coming from the bluffs to the north where the Crow and Shoshoni were positioned but initially thought it was the Crow shooting buffalo. As the intensity of fire increased, two Crow scouts rushed into the army's encampment shouting, "Lakota, Lakota!" By 8:30 am, the Sioux and Cheyenne had hotly engaged Crook's Indian allies on the high ground north of the main body. Heavily outnumbered, the Crow and Shoshoni fell back toward the camp, but their fighting withdrawal gave Crook time to deploy his forces.

The battle which ensued would last for six hours and consist of disconnected actions and charges and counter-charges by Crook and Crazy Horse, the two forces spread out over a fluid front three miles wide. The Lakota and Cheyenne were divided into several groups as were the soldiers as the battle progressed. The soldiers could fend off assaults by the Indians and force them to retreat but could not catch and destroy them.

Crook initially directed his forces to seize the high ground north and south of the Rosebud Creek. He ordered Captain Van Vliet with two troops of the 3rd Cavalry to occupy the high bluffs south of the Creek to guard against an Indian attack from the direction. In the north, the commands of Major Chambers with two companies of the 4th Infantry and three companies of the 9th Infantry and Captain Noyes with three troops of the 2nd Cavalry, formed a dismounted skirmish line and advanced toward the Lakota. Their progress was slow due to flanking fire from Indians occupying the high ground to the northeast.

To accelerate the advance, Crook ordered Captain Anson Mills, commanding six troops of the 3rd Cavalry, to charge the Lakota. Mills' mounted charge unnerved the Indians and they withdrew along the ridge line. Mills quickly re-formed three troops and led another charge, driving the Indians northwest again to the next hill. Preparing to drive the Indians from there, Mills received orders from Crook to cease the advance and assume a defensive posture. Chambers and Noyes led their forces forward in support and within minutes joined Mills on top of the ridge. The bulk of Crook's command, joined by the packers and miners, occupied a hill they called Crook's Hill. Establishing his headquarters there at approximately 9:30 am, Crook considered his next move.

During Mills' advance the event occurred that would name the battle for the Cheyenne. A Cheyenne warrior, Comes in Sight, had his horse shot. While fleeing on foot from Mills' advancing soldiers, his sister Buffalo Calf Road Woman (Mutsimiuna) rode to his rescue. Comes in Sight jumped onto her horse and the two successfully escaped. Mills was impressed with the swarming Indians at his front. "They were the best cavalry soldiers on earth. In charging up toward us they exposed little of their person, hanging on with one arm around the neck and one leg over the horse, firing and lancing from underneath the horses' necks, so that there was no part of the Indian at which we could aim."

Crook's initial charges secured key terrain but did little damage to the Indians. Assaults scattered the Indians but they did not quit the field. After falling back, the Lakota and Cheyenne kept firing from a distance and attacked several times in small parties. When counterattacked by the soldiers, the warriors sped away on their swift horses. Crook realized his charges were ineffective.

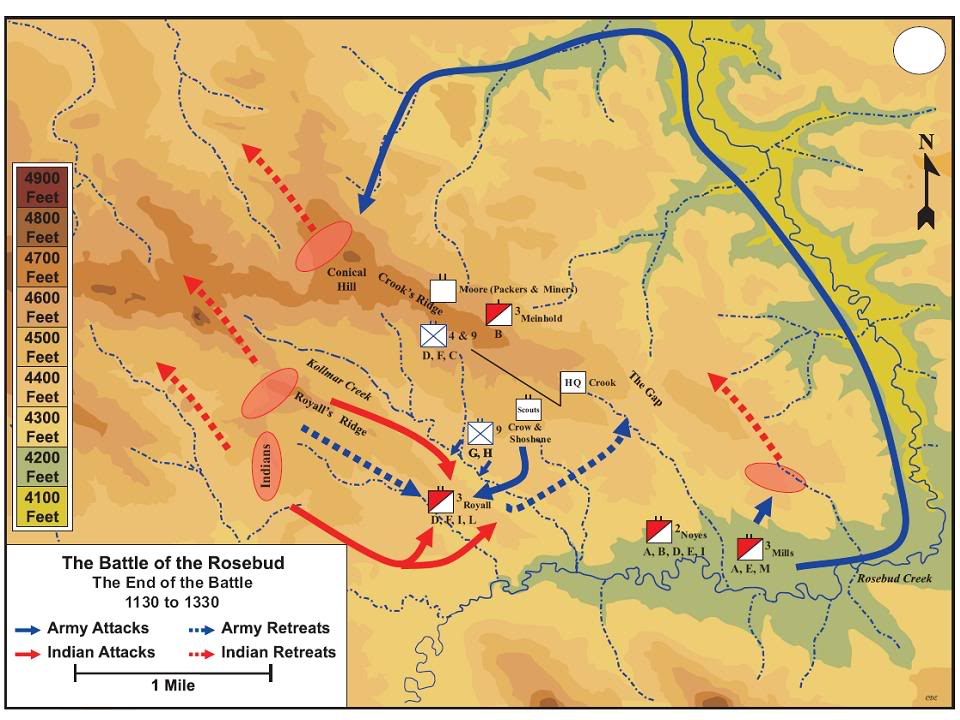
The position of the opposing forces at the end of the battle as the Indians withdrew

Crook believed incorrectly that the unusual tenacity of the Lakota and Cheyenne was based on defense of their families in a nearby village. He ordered Captains Mills and Noyes to withdraw their cavalry from the high ground on Crook's Hill and swing eastward to follow the Rosebud north to find the suspected village. He recalled Van Vliet's battalion from the south side of the Rosebud to reinforce him on Crook's Hill. While Mills and Noyes made their way up the Rosebud, searching for a village that did not exist, the situation of Lt. Colonel William B. Royall, Crook's second in command, had worsened. Royall had pursued the Indians attacking Crook's camp with six companies of cavalry. Royall advanced rapidly along the ridge line to the northwest to a point about one mile away from Crook and separated by the valley of Kolmarr Creek. The Lakota and Cheyenne shifted their main effort away from Crook and concentrated their attacks on Royall, and he was in danger of being cut off from Crook. Seeing this danger, Crook sent orders to Royall to withdraw to Crook's Hill. Royall sent only one company to join Crook, claiming later his forces had been too hotly engaged to withdraw.

Royall's situation continued to worsen, and he tried to withdraw his entire command across Kollmar Creek, but the Indians' fire was too heavy. Next, he began to withdraw southeast along the ridge line. A large group of Sioux and Cheyenne broke off from the fight against Crook's main forces and charged boldly down the valley of Kollmar Creek, advancing all the way to the Rosebud. When Captain Guy V. Henry was wounded, his soldiers began to panic, but the Crow and Shoshoni arrived and drove the Lakota and Cheyenne back. Crook also sent two infantry companies to occupy a nearby hill to aid Royall with long-range rifle fire, which kept the Lakota and Cheyenne at a distance. The Lakota and Cheyenne did not attempt any serious attacks on the infantry, respecting the longer range of their rifles as compared to the carbines the cavalry carried. The Crow, Shoshoni, and the two infantry companies probably saved Royall's command from destruction.

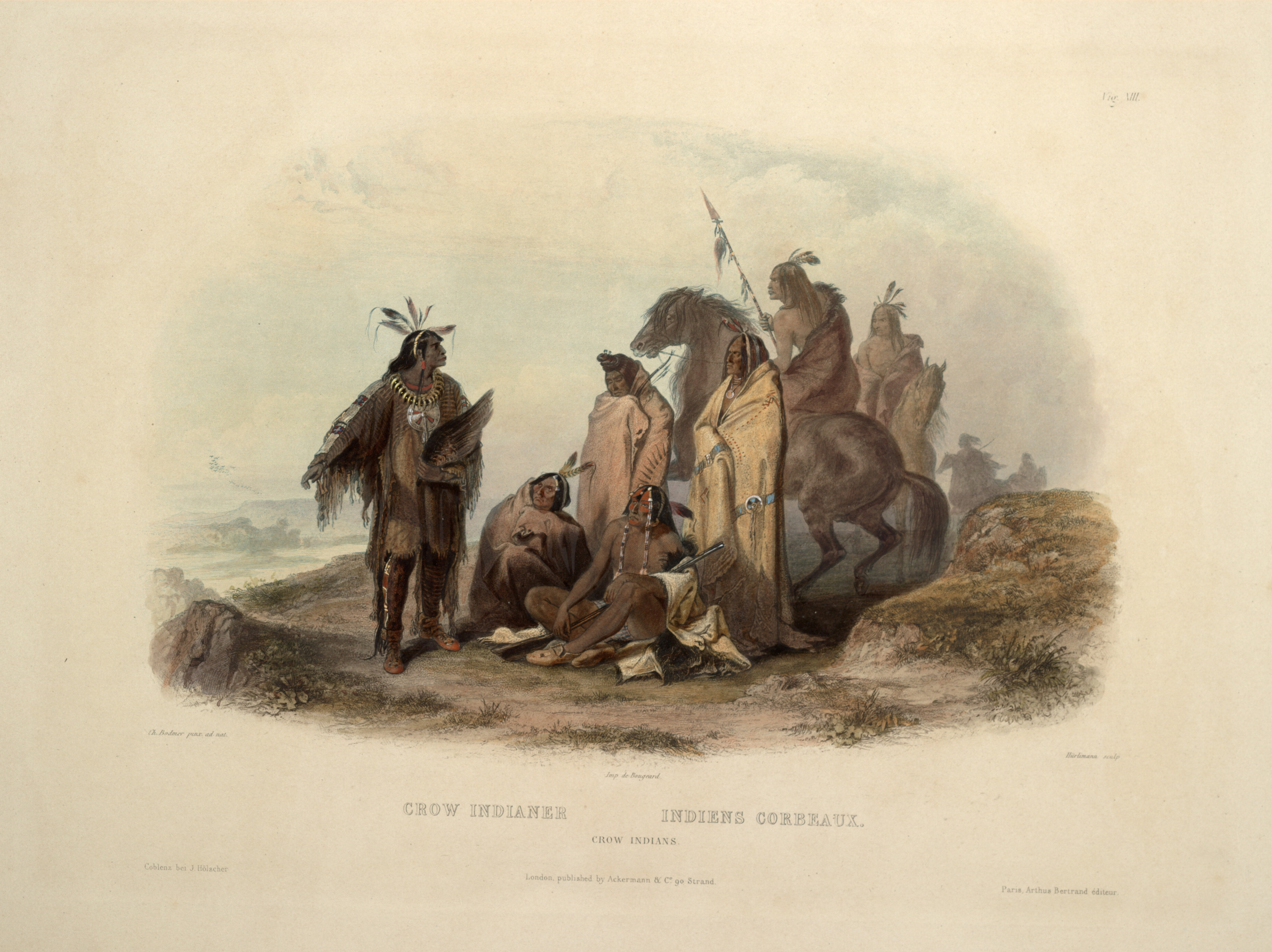
Crow tribe members. The Crow and Shoshoni allies prevented Crook from being surprised and possibly suffering a catastrophic defeat.

At approximately 11:30, Royall continued his withdrawal to the southeast and assumed a new defensive position. He was under attack on three sides. From his headquarters, Crook realized that Royall needed help that only Mills' force, which was descending Rosebud Creek two or three miles away, could provide. Crook sent orders to Mills redirecting him to turn west and attack the rear of the Indians pressing Royall.

At approximately 12:30, Royall began another withdrawal into the Kollmar ravine. His cavalry remounted and prepared to ride through gunfire to reach the relative safety of Crook's main position. As the US cavalry began their dash, the Crow and Shoshoni scouts counter-charged the pursuing Lakota and Cheyenne and relieved much of the pressure on Royall's men. The two companies of infantry provided covering fire from the northeast side of the ravine. Royall's command suffered most of the U.S. casualties during the battle.

Mills arrived too late on the Lakota and Cheyenne flank to assist Royall's withdrawal, but his unexpected appearance caused the Lakota and Cheyenne to break contact and retire from the battlefield. The cavalry pursued the Indians, but soon gave up the chase. The battle of the Rosebud was over about 2:30 pm.

=== Casualties and aftermath ===
Estimates of casualties by both the soldiers and the Indians vary widely. Crook said he had 10 killed and 21 wounded. His aide John Gregory Bourke added that 4 of the wounds were mortal and gave total casualties as 57. Frank Grouard said that 28 soldiers were killed and 56 wounded. Estimates of Crow killed range from one to five and Shoshoni from one to eight. The Lakota and Cheyenne casualties are likewise uncertain with estimates of the number killed ranging from 10 to 100. The Crow reportedly took 13 scalps (although scalps might be cut into pieces and divided among warriors). Crazy Horse reportedly later said that the Lakota and Cheyenne casualties were 36 killed and 63 wounded. How he came up with such a precise number is unknown, as it seems unlikely that the Indians compiled a statistical record of the casualties among the eight or so Sioux and Lakota bands plus the Cheyenne and a few Arapaho who participated in the battle.

By the standards of the usual hit-and-run raids of the Plains Indians, the Battle of the Rosebud was a long and bloody engagement. The Lakota and Cheyenne fought with persistence and demonstrated a willingness to accept casualties rather than break off the encounter. The delaying action by Crook's Indian allies during the early stages of the battle saved his command from a devastating surprise attack. The intervention of the Crow and Shoshoni scouts throughout the battle was crucial to averting disaster for Crook.

Crook claimed victory by virtue of occupying the battlefield at the end of the day, but his actions belie his claim. Concerned for his wounded and short on supplies, Crook retraced his steps to his camp on Goose Creek, near Sheridan, Wyoming, and remained there immobile for seven weeks awaiting reinforcements. He would play no role in the Battle of the Little Bighorn eight days later. Crook's Crow and Shoshoni allies left the army for their homes shortly after the battle. The Lakota and Cheyenne returned to the battlefield after Crook's departure and piled up rocks at the location of key events in the battle. Some of the rock piles they built are still there.

==== U.S. ammunition expenditures ====
One immediate question from the U.S. Army that followed the battle of the Rosebud was how between 10,000 and 25,000 rounds of 45-70 caliber rifle and carbine ammunition could have been expended during a half day's fight with only a dozen or so enemy casualties, especially considering the use of single shot rifles and carbines.

These questions resulted in the investigations of the weapon's extraction system, the composition of the brass shell casings, the cleaning of the weapon, and proper individual training and military tactics. In U.S. military publications such as the Journal of the Military Service Institution and the United Service, Army officers attempted to address these questions and problems.

One suggested reason for the high expenditure of ammunition and the low enemy casualty rate was when Army Scout Bat Pourier reported to Gen. Crook that "he had watched men leave great numbers of cartridges on the ground. Infantrymen on the initial skirmish line would lie down or kneel and fire and in doing so would draw handfuls of cartridges from their belts and place them on the ground beside them, handy for use." When the men moved to another position, forward or otherwise, they sometimes left a pile of ammunition where they had laid it.

== Historic site ==
The battle site is preserved at the Rosebud Battlefield State Park in Big Horn County, Montana. The site was listed on the National Register of Historic Places in 1972 and was further designated a National Historic Landmark in 2008.

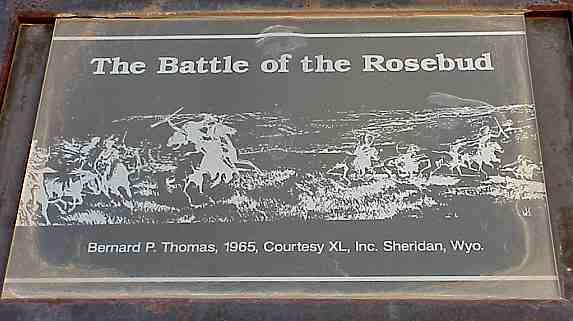
Site sign, 2003

== Order of battle ==
=== United States ===
- Department of the Platte – Brigadier General George Crook
  - 2nd United States Cavalry Regiment - Companies A, B, D, E, and I
  - 3rd United States Cavalry Regiment - Companies A, B, C, D, E, F, G, I, L, and M
  - 4th United States Infantry Regiment - Companies D and F
  - 9th United States Infantry Regiment - Companies C, G, and H
- Crow Scouts
- Shoshoni Scouts
- Civilians

=== Sioux and Cheyenne ===
- Crazy Horse
- Lakota (Sioux), Oglala (Scatters Their Own), Hunkpapa (Camps by the Horn), Itazipco (They have no bows) or (Sans Arc), Sihasapa (Black Feet band of Lakota), Minicoujou or Miniconjou (Plants by the water), Oohenumpa (Two Kettles), Sicangu (Burnt Thighs) or (Brulé)
- Dakota (Santee Sioux).
- Northern Cheyenne
- Northern Arapaho

== See also ==
- List of battles won by Indigenous peoples of the Americas
- The Other Magpie
- Battle of the Little Bighorn

== Bibliography ==
- Dillon, Richard H. (1983). North American Indian Wars.
- Finerty, John F., War-path and Bivouac: or, the Conquest of the Sioux: a first-hand account by a Chicago newspaper reporter accompanying the Crook expedition and present at the Rosebud
- Vaughn, J. W. (1956). With Crook at the Rosebud. Stackpole Co. p. 245.
