= Chief Dull Knife College =

Tribal land-grant community college in Montana, U.S.

- Former name: Dull Knife Memorial College (1975–2001)
- Type: Public tribal land-grant community college
- Established: September 1975
- Parent institution: Northern Cheyenne Tribe
- Academic affiliations: AIHEC; AACC; Space-grant
- President: Eva Flying
- Undergraduates: 300
- Location: Lame Deer, Montana, United States
- Campus: Rural
- Website: www.cdkc.edu

Chief Dull Knife College is a public tribal land-grant community college on the Northern Cheyenne Indian Reservation in Lame Deer, Montana. It is an open-admission college with about 141 students. On average, more than half of its graduates move on to four-year colleges.

The college has one main building which houses administration, faculty offices, cafeteria facilities, bookstore, a learning center and sufficient classroom space to serve 300 students. Specialized laboratory facilities include a science laboratory, two computing labs, and a distance learning center and welding laboratory. In addition, separate facilities house the library, information technology, cultural center, the early childhood learning center, the adult education literacy center, the technical skills center, student activities center, student learning center, student lounge and Vocational Rehabilitation Center.

== History ==
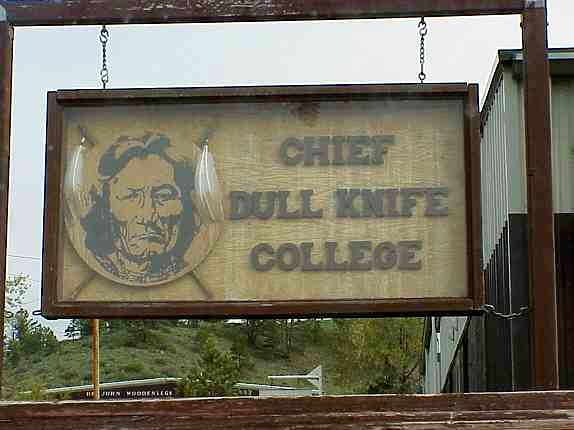
Chief Dull Knife College sign

Previously known as Dull Knife Memorial College, CDKC was renamed in 2001 to emphasize the significance of Dull Knife as a chief and respected historical leader of the Northern Cheyenne people.

It was noticed that few Cheyenne who were attending colleges away from the reservation were actually graduating; many were dropping out and returning to the reservation. Theories were advanced that students were having difficulty adjusting to a culturally different environment; another that they were being subjected to racial discrimination. Cheyenne students often had family responsibilities, caring for children or elderly relatives, while the available educational institutions were located far from the reservation. Students from the tribe were not adequately prepared for rigorous academic work due to poor quality education and resources. These problems were shared by many tribes, and as such the tribal colleges and universities movement began among American Indian educators in an effort to provide educational opportunities to Indian students that were tailored to their cultural and educational needs. Beginning with Diné College in Tsaile, Arizona, on the Navajo Nation in 1968, tribal colleges were opened on many reservations.

Chartered in September 1975 under the leadership of former tribal president John Woodenlegs, Dull Knife Memorial College originally operated in army tents training students in mining, construction and forestry for development in nearby communities. In 1975 funding for permanent facilities was granted by the BIA. In 1978, it began to offer academic courses leading to Associate of Arts and Associate of Applied Science degrees, as well as vocational certificates. Associate degrees generally require two years of work over 6 semesters. It has proven difficult due to lack of funding to fully realize the cultural goals related to Cheyenne culture, but significant progress has been made. Enrollment is 85% American Indian with 90% of the students having a background of poverty.

In 1994, the college was designated a land-grant college alongside 31 other tribal colleges.

== Academics ==
The original curriculum of the college was directed at training students for mining jobs near the reservation. Today the college has an expanded offering of associate degrees, certificate programs, and post-secondary transfer programs.

== Partnerships ==
Chief Dull Knife College (CDKC) was chartered in 1975 by the Northern Cheyenne Tribal Council. The college is accredited by and maintains professional memberships in the American Indian Higher Education Consortium (AIHEC), the American Association of Community and Junior Colleges (AACJC), and in the Northwest Commission on Colleges and Universities.

CDKC maintains articulation agreements with institutions within the Montana University system to facilitate transfer for students. With the addition of interactive television technology at CDKC, the college has opportunities to complete advanced degrees online.

== Additional reading ==
- Ward, Carol; Wertman, Bill (2008). "Chief Dull Knife College". In Little Bear, Richard (ed.). We, the Northern Cheyenne People: our land, our history, our culture. Lame Deer, Montana: Chief Dull Knife College. pp. 113–129. LCCN 2020304375. OCLC 277229592.
