= St. Xavier, Montana =

Census-designated place in Big Horn County, Montana, United States

St. Xavier, Montana Chúukaalashe
- Census-designated place
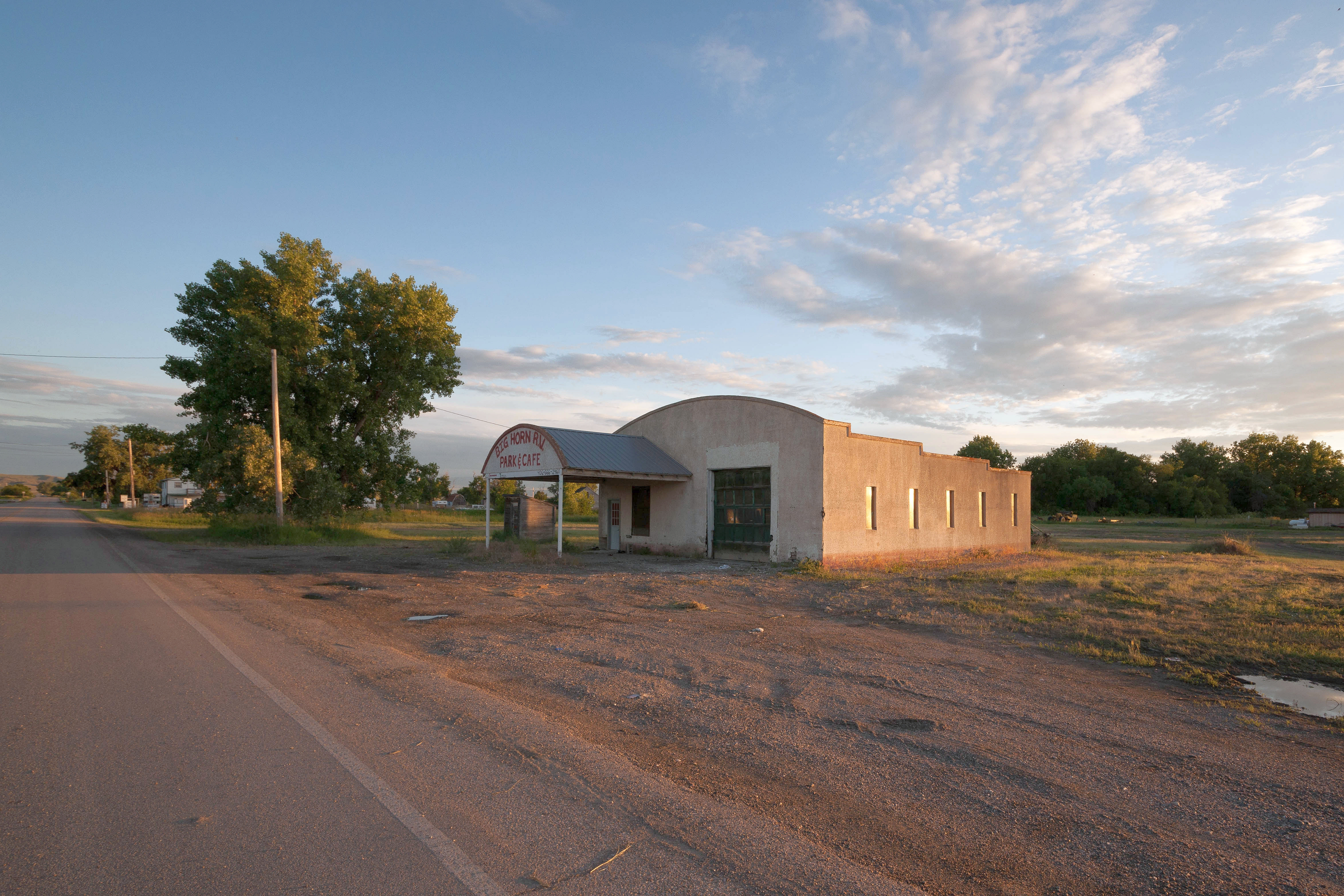
- St. Xavier in June 2014

- Location of St. Xavier, Montana
- Coordinates: 45°26′30″N 107°44′15″W
- Country: United States
- State: Montana
- County: Big Horn

Area
  - Total: 5.59 sq mi (14.49 km^{2})
  - Land: 5.59 sq mi (14.49 km^{2})
  - Water: 0 sq mi (0.00 km^{2})
- Elevation: 3,078 ft (938 m)

Population (2020)
  - Total: 78
  - Density: 13.9/sq mi (5.38/km^{2})
- Time zone: UTC-7 (Mountain (MST))
  - Summer (DST): UTC-6 (MDT)
- ZIP code: 59075
- Area code: 406
- FIPS code: 30-65650
- GNIS feature ID: 2409234

St. Xavier or Saint Xavior (Crow: Chúukaalashe) is a census-designated place (CDP) in Big Horn County, Montana, United States. It is located on the Crow Indian Reservation along the Bighorn River. The population was 78 at the 2020 census. It was 83 in 2010.

In 1887 Jesuit priests Urban Grassi and Peter Paul Prando built their permanent mission church for the Crow people. It was named for Saint Francis Xavier, cofounder of the Jesuits. The church is still in use. A mission school was also formed at the time, now called Pretty Eagle School and still associated with the Catholic church.

The town's economy is helped by fields irrigated by the Bighorn River. The nearby Bighorn Lake brings people for boating, fishing, and camping.

== Geography ==
According to the United States Census Bureau, the CDP has a total area of 5.6 square miles (14.6 km^{2}), of which 5.6 square miles (14.4 km^{2}) is land and 0.077 square miles (0.2 km^{2}), or 1.12%, is water.

== Demographics ==
Historical population
Census	Pop.	Note	%±
2020	78		—
U.S. Decennial Census

As of the census of 2000, there were 67 people, 20 households, and 18 families residing in the CDP. The population density was 12.0 people per square mile (4.6/km^{2}). There were 36 housing units at an average density of 6.5 per square mile (2.5/km^{2}). The racial makeup of the CDP was 38.81% White, 52.24% Native American, 7.46% from other races, and 1.49% from two or more races. Hispanic or Latino of any race were 22.39% of the population.

There were 20 households, out of which 55.0% had children under the age of 18 living with them, 70.0% were married couples living together, 15.0% had a female householder with no husband present, and 10.0% were non-families. 10.0% of all households were made up of individuals, and none had someone living alone who was 65 years of age or older. The average household size was 3.15 and the average family size was 3.33.

In the CDP, the population was spread out, with 32.8% under the age of 18, 13.4% from 18 to 24, 31.3% from 25 to 44, 16.4% from 45 to 64, and 6.0% who were 65 years of age or older. The median age was 28 years. For every 100 females, there were 67.5 males. For every 100 females age 18 and over, there were 95.7 males.

The median income for a household in the CDP was $19,722, and the median income for a family was $19,722. Males had a median income of $11,250 versus $15,500 for females. The per capita income for the CDP was $11,578. There were 25.0% of families and 40.7% of the population living below the poverty line, including 70.4% of under eighteens and none of those over 64.

== Notable person ==
- Tuff Harris, safety for the Miami Dolphins football team

== See also ==
- List of census-designated places in Montana
