= Corinth, Montana =

Unincorporated community in Montana, United States

- Unincorporated community
- Location within Montana Location within the United States
- Coordinates: 45°51′21″N 107°57′53″W
- Country: United States
- State: Montana
- County: Big Horn
- Elevation: 3,104 ft (946 m)

Population
  - Total: N/A
- Time zone: UTC-7 (Mountain (MST))
  - Summer (DST): UTC-6 (MDT)
- Area code: 406
- GNIS feature ID: 770091

Corinth is an unincorporated community and Ghost Town in Big Horn County, Montana, United States.

== History ==
Corinth was established in 1908 and developed along the Chicago, Burlington and Quincy Railroad. Corinth was an agricultural community with a grain elevator and train stop. As with many towns and communities of its type, it declined with changes to more reliable transportation technologies and it was no longer needed as a pick up station.

The Corinth townsite is located along Fly Creek, northwest of Hardin. The old store and post office building from Corinth has been restored and moved to the grounds of the Big Horn County Museum in Hardin. The store was built in 1918 by L. R. Good of Sheridan, Wyoming. The store had living quarters in the rear and also housed the Corinth Post Office. The post office was active from 1915 to 1953. Some historic buildings are still onsite, though many, including the elevator, have been dismantled.
