= Garryowen, Montana =

Unincorporated community in Montana, United States

Garryowen
- Unincorporated community
- Location in Montana Garryowen (the United States)
- Coordinates: 45°31′40″N 107°25′03″W
- Country: United States
- State: Montana
- County: Big Horn
- Established: 1895

Government
  - Type: Private Town
  - Honorary Mayor & Owner: Chris Kortlander

Area
  - Total: 1 sq mi (2.6 km^{2})
  - Land: 2.6 sq mi (6.7 km^{2})
- Elevation: 3,117 ft (950 m)

Population (2010)
  - Total: 2
- Time zone: UTC-7 (Mountain (MST))
  - Summer (DST): UTC-6 (MDT)
- ZIP code: 59031
- Area code: 406
- GNIS feature ID: 771723

Garryowen is a private town in Big Horn County, Montana, United States. It is located at the southernmost edge of the land where Sitting Bull's camp was sited just prior to the Battle of the Little Bighorn, and the opening gunshots of the battle were fired only a few hundred yards from where Garryowen's structures stand today.

Garryowen has a population of just 2 and consists mainly of a large building (the "Town Hall") with multiple functions. This building houses a Conoco petrol station and convenience store, a Subway sandwich franchise, an arts & crafts store called "The Trading Post", and the Custer Battlefield Museum, a private museum whose exhibits focus on the battle and the period of the Indian Wars. Garryowen is owned by Chris Kortlander, and it was put up for sale in 2012, but an auction in August of that year was cancelled after no one registered to bid.

== History of Garryowen ==
In 1895, the Chicago, Burlington and Quincy (now BNSF) Railroad established a tiny station on the Little Bighorn River, where water was taken on and US Army troops, supplies and mail were off-loaded for delivery to nearby forts and homesteads. This station was called "Garryowen," a name associated with the U.S. 7th Cavalry Regiment because of the stirring Irish air of the same name which became the regiment's marching song.

When the Crow Indian Reservation lands were created in 1868, Garryowen became part of the Crow's holdings, but the land was later sold by the tribe and the Federal government to private citizens. By 1926, the "town" of Garryowen was in private hands, but still consisted of little more than a small market. It was at this time, just a month before the 50th Anniversary of the Battle, that work was being done on an irrigation ditch just east of Garryowen - along Marcus Reno's line of retreat. Much to their surprise, work crews uncovered a nearly complete set of skeletal remains (no skull was ever found), accompanied by several bullets and buttons, clearly indicating that this had been a Cavalry soldier. Because 14 of Reno and Frederick Benteen's men were never accounted for following the Battle, accurate identification of the remains was impossible. However, with planning for the celebration's events in full swing, The Custer Memorial Association decided a memorial service, with full military honors, was due this long-lost Unknown Soldier.

Plans called for the body to be entombed in a special monument in Garryowen, following a "Burying the hatchet" ceremony, during which US government and Indian representatives smoked a peace pipe and placed a tomahawk in the base of the monument.

== Attractions ==
=== Tomb of the Unknown Soldier & Peace Memorial ===
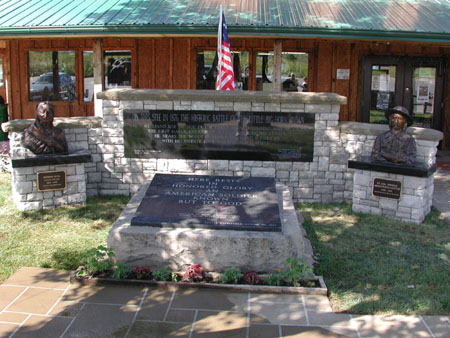
Tomb of the Unknown Soldier & Peace Memorial in Garryowen, Montana

The tomb is a monument that commemorates the end of hostilities between the Lakota-Cheyenne and the U.S. Government.

Although it is publicly described as the resting-place of an unknown Army combatant from the Reno retreat, disclosure documents from an auctioning firm responsible for the August 2012 auction of the town raised some uncertainty as to whether there are actual human remains in the tomb.

=== Custer Battlefield Museum ===
The Custer Battlefield Museum features many artifacts from the Battle as well as books and memorabilia.

In 2005 and 2009, 22 artifacts from the museum, described as "a trove of war bonnets, medicine bags and other items" alleged to have been stolen from the Crow tribe were seized by Federal authorities. Although the case was dropped in 2009, as of March 19, 2012 some of the items had not been returned.

=== The Center Pole ===
Located on Wellknown Buffalo's historic Indian trust land on the Crow (Apsaalooke) Indian Reservation, this Native, non profit organization's mission is to increase knowledge, justice and sovereignty in Native communities. The property is home to Wellknown Buffalo Coffee Shop, Buffalo Nickel Thrift Store, a community enterprise selling recycled clothing and housewares, and Crow Voices Community Radio, the first radio station on the reservation. Three of the buildings are hybrid straw bale constructed buildings and a demonstration alternative energy "earth lodge" is in the process of being completed. Center Pole's Executive Director Peggy Wellknown Buffalo is a Petra Fellow (www.petrafoundation.org) and an Unsung Hero of Compassion (www.newunsungheros.org) and blessed as such by the Dalai Lama in 2014. More information can be found at www.thecenterpole.org.

== Notable person ==
Henry Real Bird of Garryowen was appointed Poet Laureate of Montana by Governor Brian Schweitzer in 2009.
