= Northern Cheyenne Indian Reservation =

Federally recognized indigenous tribe and reservation in Montana, U.S.

Coordinates: 45°31′56″N 106°40′48″W

Northern Cheyenne Tribe of the Northern Cheyenne Indian Reservation Tsėhéstáno
- Indian Reservation
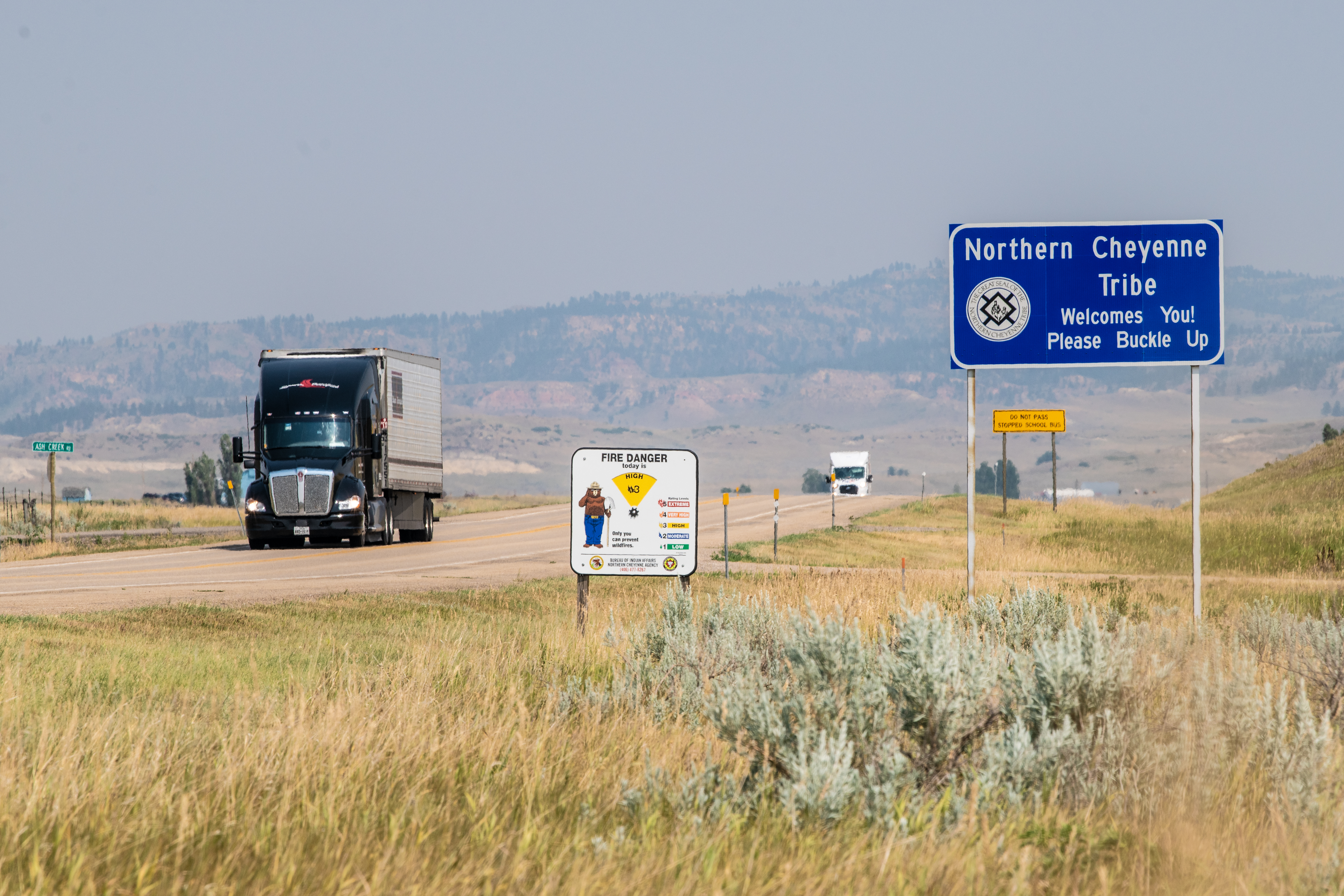
- Welcome sign

- Flag

- Location of Northern Cheyenne Indian Reservation
- Country: United States
- States: Montana
- Established: 1884
- Headquarters: Lame Deer

Government
  - Governing body: Tribal council
  - Tribal president: Ernest Littlemouth (acting)

Population (2013)
  - Total: 4,939
- Time zone: UTC-7 (MST)
  - Summer (DST): UTC-6 (MDT)

The Northern Cheyenne Tribe of the Northern Cheyenne Indian Reservation (Cheyenne: Tsėhéstáno) is the federally recognized Northern Cheyenne tribe and a Plains tribe.

The Northern Cheyenne Indian Reservation is a reservation located in southeastern Montana, that is approximately 690 square miles (1,800 km^{2}) large. It is home to approximately 5,000 Cheyenne people. The tribe call themselves Cheyenne: Tsétsėhéstȧhese (Tse-TSES-tas) which means "the beautiful people".

The reservation is bounded on the east by the Tongue River and on the west by the Crow Reservation. There are small parcels of non-contiguous off-reservation trust lands in Meade County, South Dakota, northeast of the city of Sturgis. Its timbered ridges that extend into northwestern South Dakota are part of Custer National Forest and it is approximately 40 miles (64 km) east of the site of the 1876 Battle of the Little Bighorn.

In 2026 the Tribe had approximately 11,266 enrolled tribal members with about 5,012 residing on the reservation. In March 2013, the Northern Cheyenne Tribe had 12,266 people enrolled citizens, of which about 6,012 resided on the reservation, with approximately 91% of the population Native American (full or part blood quantum) and 72.8% identifying as Cheyenne. Slightly more than a quarter of the population five years or older spoke a language other than English. Members of the Crow Tribe also live on the reservation.

The tribal and government headquarters are located in Lame Deer, where they host the annual Northern Cheyenne powwow. Other celebrations include the Memorial Day Powwow, White River Days Celebration, Lame Deer 4th of July Pow Wow, and the Ashland Labor Day Pow Wow.

== Demographics ==
Traditional Cheyenne spiritual culture, like most traditional Indigenous spiritual ways, values the peoples' connection to their landbase, and sees the land itself, as well as special sites like Bear Butte, as sacred. Numerous Cheyenne work as foresters and fire fighters. This spiritual perspective is evident in traditional communities like Lame Deer and Birney and when the 2006 vote on development coal and coalbed methane on the reservation split along modernist vs traditional lines.

A historical buffalo jump, burial sites of Cheyenne chiefs and spiritual leaders, the site of Custer's last camp before the Battle of the Little Bighorn, the Cheyenne Indian Museum, Ten Bears Gallery, St. Labre Indian School, and the Ashland Powwow are sites of special interest in the Ashland area.

The Northern Cheyenne are related to the Southern Cheyenne, who are located in Oklahoma. Following the Black Hills War and earlier conflicts in Colorado (see Sand Creek Massacre and Washita Massacre), the Northern Cheyenne were forcibly moved to Oklahoma and restricted to lands of their southern relatives. Unable to acclimate swiftly to the heat of western Oklahoma (Indian Territory at the time), having to grow their food instead of hunting or gathering as were their ways, and the brutal conditions in the barracks where they were held, the northerners quickly began dying. In desperation, a small band left the reservation and headed north in 1878, an odyssey that came to be known as the Northern Cheyenne Exodus.

The Northern Cheyenne briefly settled around Fort Keogh (Miles City, Montana). In the early 1880s, many families began to migrate south to the Tongue River watershed area and established homesteads in the northern edge of the Powder River Basin, which they considered their natural home. The Northern Cheyenne were allies of the Lakota in the Black Hills War of 1876–1877.

The United States government established the Tongue River Indian Reservation, which consisted of 371,200 acres (1,502 km^{2}) of land, under the executive order given by President Chester A. Arthur on November 16, 1884. The boundaries originally did not include the Cheyenne who had homesteaded further east near the Tongue River, therefore those people who had were helped by the St. Labre Catholic Mission. This changed though when on March 19, 1900, President William McKinley extended the reservation to the west bank of the Tongue River, for a total of 444,157 acres (1,797.44 km^{2}). Those Cheyenne who had homesteaded east of the Tongue River were relocated to reservation lands west of the river.

== Flag ==
The Northern Cheyenne flag is blue with a white symbol representing the Morning Star. Chief Dull Knife was known as Morning Star and his descendants are "The Morning Star People". The symbolism is the past and present survival of the people. The Morning Star will rise each day and bring light to the Cheyenne people now and to those yet to be born.

== Communities and neighborhoods ==
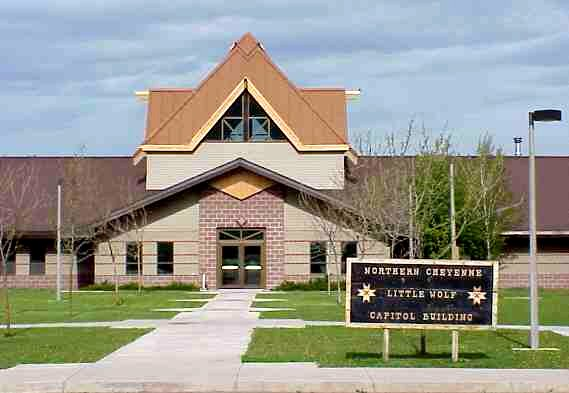
Northern Cheyenne headquarters

Map of the Northern Cheyenne Indian Reservation and nearby reservations (In deep pink).

Lame Deer, Montana, with about 4,000 residents, of which 92% are American Indian, is the capital of the Northern Cheyenne nation. Chief Dull Knife College is located there. To the west is Muddy, Montana, with about 600 residents, 94% American Indian, and further west Busby, Montana, with about 700 residents, 90% American Indian. Busby was the site of the Tongue River Boarding School, opened in 1904. The school would later become quite active in basketball, with their team playing a winning game against the Harlem Globetrotters and winning a state championship in the 1950s. The Busby White River Cheyenne Mennonite Church is located in Busby. In 1976 the reservation had 2400 people and Marie Sanchez was the Chief Judge.

Ashland, Montana, is to the east. In 1884 a Catholic boarding school, the St. Labre Indian School, was established there. The 460 residents of Ashland are about 75% American Indian. They are also very active in basketball. When Busby became part of their district, they had notable rivalry basketball games in the late 1940s and on. Birney, Montana, population about 100, 86% Indian, is south of Lame Deer and Ashland. Part of Birney, "White Birney", lies south of the reservation.

Colstrip, Montana, is a neighboring industrial city devoted to coal mining and electrical generation. Located 20 miles north of the reservation, it has a population of about 2,300 residents, of which approximately 240, or 11%, are American Indians. It is also where some Cheyenne attend public school or live for work.

=== Historic Northern Cheyenne bands ===
Known in Cheyenne either as Notameohmésêhese or Notameohmésėhétaneo'o meaning "Northern Eaters" or simply as Ohmésêhese / Ôhmésêheseo'o meaning "Eaters".

- Notameohmésêhese / Notameohmésėhétaneo'o proper ("Northern Eaters", also simply known as Ȯhmésėhese / Ôhmésêheseo'o or Omísis – "Eaters" - They go by these names because they were known as great hunters and therefore had a good supply of meat to feed their people. They were the most populous Cheyenne group, inhabiting land from the northern and western Black Hills (Mo'ȯhtávo'honáéva – ″black-rock-Location″) toward the Powder River Country (Páeo'hé'e – ″gunpowder river″ or ″coal river″). Often they were accompanied by their Totoemanaho and Northern Só'taeo'o kin and had through intermarriages close ties to Lakota. Today they, along with the Northern Só'taeo'o, are the most influential among the Northern Cheyenne.
- Northern Oévemanaho / Oivimána (Northern Oévemana – "Northern Scabby", "Northern Scalpers" - They now live in and around Birney, Montana (Oévemanâhéno – ″scabby-band-place″) near the confluence of the Tongue River and Hanging Woman Creek in the southeastern corner of the Northern Cheyenne Indian Reservation)
- Northern Só'taeo'o / Só'taétaneo'o (Suhtai or Sutaio - They married only other Só'taeo'o (Northern or Southern alike) and camped separate from the other Cheyenne camps. They maintained closest ties to the Notameohmésêhese band and lived in the northern and western Black Hills (Mo'ȯhtávo'honáéva – ″black-rock-Location″). They also roamed together with their Notameohmésêhese and Totoemanaho kin in the Powder River Country (Páeo'hé'e), remaining north of the Platte River. They gained higher band numbers than their southern kin because of better Northern hunting and grass. They now live in and around Birney, Montana (Oévemanâhéno – ″scabby-band-place″). Today they, along with the Notameohmésêhese, are the most influential among the Northern Cheyenne.

Lesser northern bands (not represented in the Council of Forty-Four):

- Anskówînîs / Anskowinis ("Narrow Nose", "narrow-nose-bridge" - They are named after their first chief, properly named Broken Dish, but nicknamed Anskówǐnǐs. They separated from the Ôhmésêheseo'o because of a quarrel.
- Moktavhetaneo / Mo'ȯhtávėhetaneo'o (Mo'ôhtávêhetane – "Black skinned Men", "Ute-like Men" They are named this because they had darker skin than other Cheyenne and looked more like the Utes. Their name also means ″Mountain Men″, maybe descended from Ute (Mo'ȯhtávėhetaneo'o) captives. They live today in the Lame Deer, Montana (Mo'ȯhtávȯheomenéno – ″black-lodge-place″) district on the Northern Cheyenne Indian Reservation. Lame Deer, the tribal and government agency headquarters, was also the place where rations were given out and is known as Meaveʼhoʼeno – ″the giving place″ or ″giving-whiteman-place″.
- Ononeo'o / Ononeo ("Arikara People" or ″Ree Band″) - This band is of mixed Cheyenne-Arikara and Mandan heritage. They were formerly associated with the mixed Cheyenne-Lakota Masikota band and sometimes considered a Masikota subband. today they live in the nonofficial Rosebud/Ree district (Ónoneo'o), politically part of the Muddy Creek district, between Busby and Muddy Creek, some are also present in the Lame Deer district)
- Totoemanaho / Totoimana (Totoemana, Tútoimanáh – "Backward Clan", "Shy Clan" or "Bashful Clan", also translated as ″Reticent Band″, and ″Unwilling Band″, so named because they prefer to camp by themselves, lived in the northern and western Black Hills (Mo'ȯhtávo'honáéva – ″black-rock-Location″) and along the Tongue River (Vétanovéo'hé'e – ″Tongue River″), roamed together with their Notameohmésêhese and Northern Só'taeo'o kin also in the Powder River Country (Páeo'hé'e), had through intermarriages close ties to Lakota, now centered in and around Ashland, Montana (Vóhkoohémâhoéve'ho'éno, formerly called Totoemanáheno) immediately east of the boundary of the Northern Cheyenne Indian Reservation)
- Vóhpoométaneo'o / Woxpometaneo (Voxpometaneo – "White River People", ″White River Cheyenne″) Named for the White River (Vóhpoome) near Pine Ridge in South Dakota and also named after a large extended family as Wóopotsît or Wóhkpotsit – "White Wolf", ″White Crafty People″. The majority joined their Cheyenne kin and settled in 1891 south of Kirby, Montana near the headwaters of the Rosebud Creek. They are now centered in and around Busby, Montana (Vóhpoométanéno) on the Northern Cheyenne Indian Reservation. Some stayed on the Pine Ridge Indian Reservation with their Oglala Lakota kin and are known as Tsėhésė-ho'óhomo'eo'o – ″Cheyenne-Sioux″.

== Economy ==
Major employers include St. Labre Indian School, power and construction companies, the federal and tribal governments, farming and ranching, small businesses, and the education system. The tribe is the largest employer on the reservation.

== Government ==
The Northern Cheyenne Tribal Council and President make decisions for the Tribe. The Council has members elected to represent five districts: Ashland, Birney, Busby, Muddy, and Lame Deer. The President and Tribal Council members serve four year terms.

In October 2026 Ernest Littlemouth became acting President. He replaced Gene Small who was removed from office by a Tribal Council vote.

== Education ==
Chief Dull Knife College, originally named Northern Cheyenne Indian Action Program, is an open admission Native American tribal community college and land grant institution located in Lame Deer. In 2025 the college had 125 full time students and 283 part time students enrolled. On average, more than half of the graduates move on to four-year colleges. The college is accredited by the Northwest Commission on Colleges and Universities. It is member of the American Indian Higher Education Consortium and Northwest Commission on Colleges and Universities.

Northern Cheyenne Tribal School is the reservation's tribal school located in Busby.

The reservation is the recipient of a 2010 Promise Neighborhoods grant from the United States Department of Education, through the local Boys & Girls Clubs of America.

The St. Labre Catholic boarding school educates children in pre-K-12. It serves nearly 450 students and embraces the North American culture while also celebrating catholic faith and educating children. They integrate North American culture within the school curriculum allowing for formal education to take place in addition to cultural education. Along with the school, this facility also runs a Shiloh Youth Group Home, Childcare Center, Community Outreach Services, Elderly Outreach Services, and a Work Incentive Program. These programs along with the school aim to educate the community members ad provide them with skills in order to become independent in any way they need. There is also a St. Labre museum which houses important Cheyenne artifacts and aims to display history of the culture and language in hopes people with learn from it.

== Notable Northern Cheyenne people ==
- Joseph Fire Crow (Ho'ėspenáhkohe; 1959-2017), Northern Cheyenne flutist and recording artist, Grammy nominee and Nammy winner
- Belle Highwalking (Ésevonemé'ėhné'e; 1892–1971), writer. She recorded her life and the life of the people on the reservation in 1970.
- Little Wolf (Ó'kôhómôxháahketa; c. 1820–1904), more correctly translated Little Coyote, Northern Só'taeo'o chief and Sweet Medicine Chief, was one of the "Old Man" chiefs among the Council of Forty-four, belonged to the Elk Horn Scrapers (Hémo'eoxeso), one of the four original Cheyenne military societies)
- Rynalea Whiteman Pena, chief
- Roman Nose (Vóhko'xénéhe; 1823-1868), military leader and chief of the Elk Horn Scrapers (Hémo'eoxeso), one of the four original Cheyenne military societies
- Michael Running Wolf (Mónenetse), software engineer
- Marie Sanchez (1939-2019), chief Judge, human rights activist for Indigenous people, and linguist.
- Two Moons (Éše'he Ȯhnéšesėstse; 1847–1917), chief, also known as Ónonevóo'xénéhe (Ree Roman Nose) or Mȧsėhávoo'xénéhe (Crazy Roman Nose)
- Wooden Leg (Kâhamâxéveóhtáhe; 1858–1940), warrior who fought at Little Bighorn
- Ben Nighthorse Campbell (Daev Moenha; 1933-2025), politician who represented Colorado in both the U.S. House of Representatives and in the Senate
- Eva Flying (Võestaā'e) 6th president of Chief Dull Knife College

== Sources ==
- We, the Northern Cheyenne People
- Northern Cheyenne Reservation and Off-Reservation Trust Land, Montana/South Dakota United States Census Bureau
