= Big Horn County, Montana =

County in Montana, United States

- County
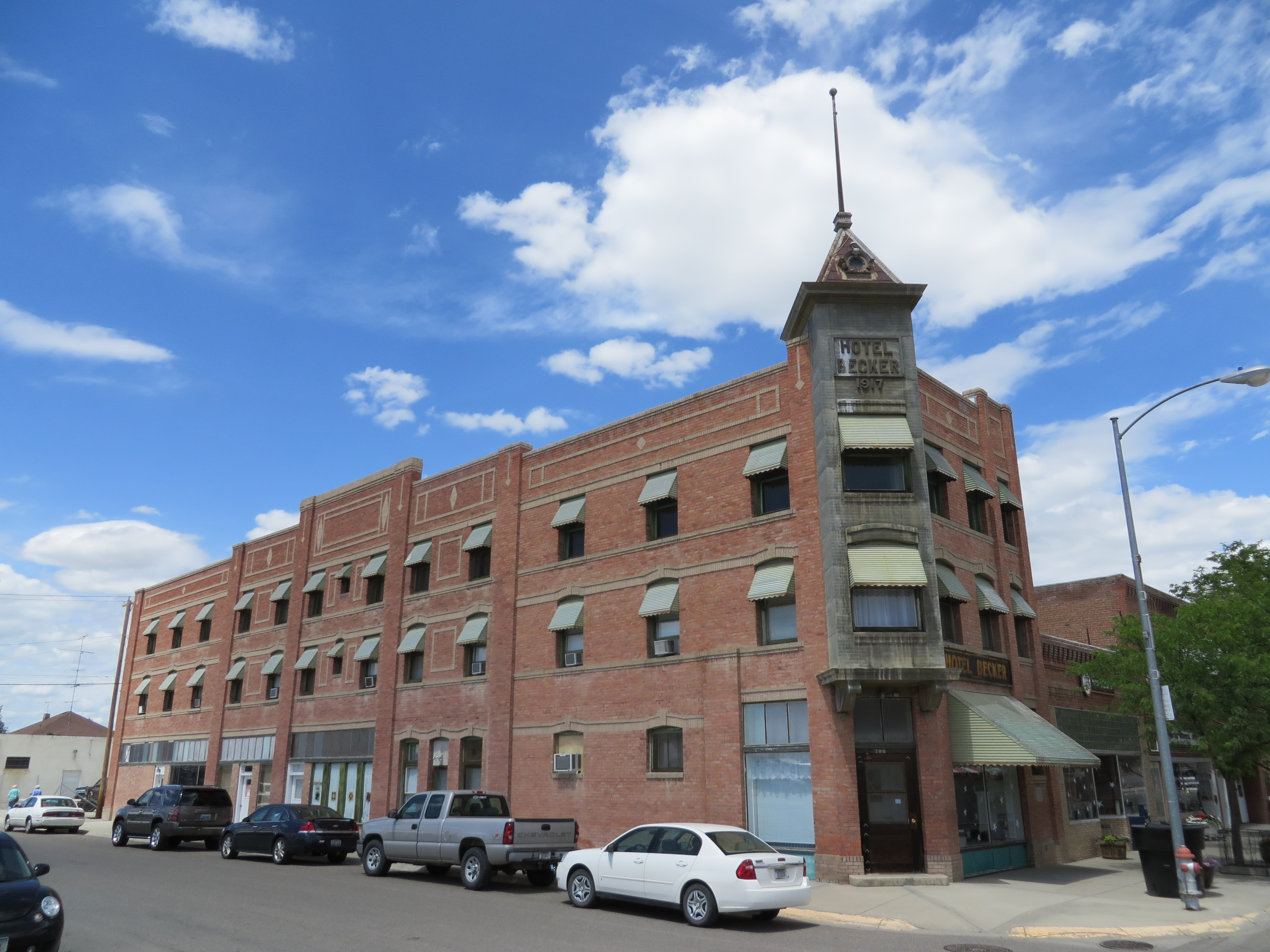
- Hotel Becker in Hardin, Montana

- Location within the U.S. state of Montana
- Coordinates: 45°26′N 107°29′W
- Country: United States
- State: Montana
- Founded: January 13, 1913
- Named for: Bighorn sheep
- Seat: Hardin
- Largest city: Hardin

Area
  - Total: 5,015 sq mi (12,990 km^{2})
  - Land: 4,995 sq mi (12,940 km^{2})
  - Water: 19 sq mi (49 km^{2}) 0.4%

Population (2020)
  - Total: 13,124
  - Estimate (2025): 12,752 ▼
  - Density: 2.5/sq mi (0.97/km^{2})
- Time zone: UTC−7 (Mountain)
  - Summer (DST): UTC−6 (MDT)
- Congressional district: 2nd
- Website: www.bighorncountymt.gov
- Montana county number 22

Big Horn County is a county located in the U.S. state of Montana. As of the 2020 census, the population was 13,124. The county seat is Hardin. The county, like the river and the mountain range, is named after the bighorn sheep in the Rocky Mountains. The county was founded in 1913.

It is located on the southern boundary of the state. Most of the area is part of the Crow Indian Reservation. Reservation poverty affects the county, which is the second-poorest county in the state.

== History ==
The history and evolution of Big Horn County requires looking at it as a territorial designation, rather than a functioning civic entity. The Big Horn County first established in 1865 by the Montana Territory is not the same modernized iteration of the Big Horn County that was established in 1913, which this article will outline.

=== Territorial origins (1865) ===
==== Montana Territorial Legislative Assembly ====
Big Horn County was first established on February 2, 1865 by the first legislative assembly of the Montana Territory. It served as one of the nine foundational counties established by the legislature alongside Beaverhead, Chouteau, Deer Lodge, Gallatin, Jefferson, Edgerton, Madison, and Missoula.

On June 25, 1876, the Battle of Little Bighorn began. The Battle is also known as the Battle of the Greasy Grass to the Lakota and other Plains Indians.

The combatants were warriors of the Lakota Sioux, Northern Cheyenne, and Arapaho tribes, battling the 7th Regiment of the US Cavalry, along with their Crow, and Arikara scouts. The battle was an overwhelming victory for the Lakota and Cheyenne. The death of Custer and his troops became a rallying point for the United States to increase their efforts to force native peoples onto reservation lands.

== Law and government ==
The county has several jurisdictions, each with its own regulations and law enforcement agencies. The Crow and Northern Cheyenne Indian Nations are administered by the tribes. Little Bighorn Battlefield and the Big Horn Canyon National Recreation Area are regulated by the National Park Service. The remainder of the county falls under the State of Montana.

== Geography ==
According to the United States Census Bureau, the county has a total area of 5,015 square miles (12,990 km^{2}), of which 4,995 square miles (12,940 km^{2}) is land and 19 square miles (49 km^{2}) (0.4%) is water. It is the fifth-largest county in Montana by land area. Most of the county's land area is Indian reservations: The Crow Indian Reservation covers 64.2 percent of its area, while the Northern Cheyenne Indian Reservation covers another 6.37 percent.

The county is home to the Big Horn, Pryor and Wolf mountain ranges.

=== Major highways ===
- Interstate 90
- U.S. Highway 87
- U.S. Highway 212
- Montana Highway 47
- Montana Highway 313
- Montana Highway 314

=== Adjacent counties ===
- Carbon - west
- Yellowstone - northwest
- Treasure - north
- Rosebud - northeast
- Powder River - east
- Sheridan County, Wyoming - south
- Big Horn County, Wyoming - southwest

=== National protected areas ===
- Bighorn Canyon National Recreation Area (part)
- Little Bighorn Battlefield National Monument

=== Climate ===
According to the Köppen Climate Classification system, Big Horn County has a semi-arid climate, abbreviated "BSk" on climate maps.

== Demographics ==
Historical population
Census	Pop.	Note	%±
1920	7,015		—
1930	8,543		21.8%
1940	10,419		22.0%
1950	9,824		−5.7%
1960	10,007		1.9%
1970	10,057		0.5%
1980	11,096		10.3%
1990	11,337		2.2%
2000	12,671		11.8%
2010	12,865		1.5%
2020	13,124		2.0%
2025 (est.)	12,752	▼	−2.8%
U.S. Decennial Census:

=== 2020 census ===
As of the 2020 census, the county had a population of 13,124. Of the residents, 33.4% were under the age of 18 and 13.5% were 65 years of age or older; the median age was 31.5 years. For every 100 females there were 96.7 males, and for every 100 females age 18 and over there were 93.6 males. 0.0% of residents lived in urban areas and 100.0% lived in rural areas.

The racial makeup of the county was 26.8% White, 0.1% Black or African American, 67.0% American Indian and Alaska Native, 0.4% Asian, 0.7% from some other race, and 4.9% from two or more races. Hispanic or Latino residents of any race comprised 3.9% of the population.

There were 3,927 households in the county, of which 43.3% had children under the age of 18 living with them and 29.9% had a female householder with no spouse or partner present. About 23.3% of all households were made up of individuals and 9.2% had someone living alone who was 65 years of age or older.

There were 4,522 housing units, of which 13.2% were vacant. Among occupied housing units, 64.6% were owner-occupied and 35.4% were renter-occupied. The homeowner vacancy rate was 1.1% and the rental vacancy rate was 8.8%.

=== 2010 census ===
As of the 2010 census, there were 12,865 people, 4,004 households, and 2,970 families living in the county. The population density was 2.6 inhabitants per square mile (1.0/km^{2}). There were 4,695 housing units at an average density of 0.9 units per square mile (0.35 units/km^{2}). The racial makeup of the county was 64.3% American Indian, 31.4% white, 0.5% Asian, 0.2% black or African American, 1.0% from other races, and 2.6% from two or more races. Those of Hispanic or Latino origin made up 4.0% of the population. In terms of ancestry, 12.1% were American, and 10.3% were German.

Of the 4,004 households, 45.6% had children under the age of 18 living with them, 48.8% were married couples living together, 17.3% had a female householder with no husband present, 25.8% were non-families, and 23.0% of all households were made up of individuals. The average household size was 3.18 and the average family size was 3.77. The median age was 30.5 years.

The median income for a household in the county was $36,550 and the median income for a family was $41,985. Males had a median income of $32,216 versus $27,917 for females. The per capita income for the county was $15,066. About 20.7% of families and 23.5% of the population were below the poverty line, including 32.4% of those under age 18 and 15.4% of those age 65 or over.

== Economy ==
Coal mining and agriculture play major roles in Big Horn County's economy. Farms and ranches in the county produce mainly beef cattle, sugar beets, alfalfa, and small grains.

== Politics ==
Big Horn County is generally Democratic, owing largely to its majority Native American population. It is distinguished from most other counties in rural Montana, which often lean heavily Republican. In 2024, Donald Trump carried the county by a narrow plurality, the first time a Republican won the county since Ronald Reagan in 1980.

United States presidential election results for Big Horn County, Montana
Year	Republican		Democratic		Third party(ies)	
Year	No.	%	No.	%	No.	%
1916	497	39.63%	740	59.01%	17	1.36%
1920	1,062	66.17%	475	29.60%	68	4.24%
1924	1,082	57.74%	327	17.45%	465	24.81%
1928	1,274	55.46%	1,017	44.28%	6	0.26%
1932	957	36.42%	1,637	62.29%	34	1.29%
1936	1,087	34.12%	2,037	63.94%	62	1.95%
1940	1,616	45.39%	1,926	54.10%	18	0.51%
1944	1,394	51.73%	1,289	47.83%	12	0.45%
1948	1,334	49.37%	1,328	49.15%	40	1.48%
1952	2,165	65.91%	1,114	33.91%	6	0.18%
1956	1,739	56.44%	1,342	43.56%	0	0.00%
1960	1,724	53.47%	1,497	46.43%	3	0.09%
1964	1,481	37.09%	2,509	62.83%	3	0.08%
1968	1,789	53.87%	1,319	39.72%	213	6.41%
1972	2,148	56.17%	1,552	40.59%	124	3.24%
1976	1,615	44.49%	1,962	54.05%	53	1.46%
1980	1,730	46.32%	1,644	44.02%	361	9.67%
1984	2,390	46.77%	2,681	52.47%	39	0.76%
1988	1,711	42.95%	2,233	56.05%	40	1.00%
1992	1,377	31.34%	2,154	49.02%	863	19.64%
1996	1,336	31.52%	2,453	57.87%	450	10.62%
2000	1,651	39.68%	2,345	56.36%	165	3.97%
2004	2,028	47.04%	2,215	51.38%	68	1.58%
2008	1,628	31.19%	3,516	67.37%	75	1.44%
2012	1,667	36.04%	2,882	62.30%	77	1.66%
2016	1,853	43.73%	2,094	49.42%	290	6.84%
2020	2,207	46.10%	2,491	52.04%	89	1.86%
2024	2,188	48.95%	2,112	47.25%	170	3.80%

== Communities ==
=== City ===
- Hardin (county seat)

=== Town ===
- Lodge Grass

=== Census-designated places ===
- Busby
- Crow Agency
- Fort Smith
- Forty Mile Colony
- Muddy
- Pryor
- St. Xavier
- Wyola

=== Unincorporated communities ===
- Aberdeen
- Benteen
- Decker
- Dunmore
- Garryowen
- Kingley
- Toluca

=== Former communities ===
- Corinth
- Kirby
- Quietus

== See also ==
- List of lakes of Big Horn County, Montana
- List of mountains in Big Horn County, Montana
- National Register of Historic Places listings in Big Horn County, Montana
