= National Register of Historic Places listings in Bighorn Canyon National Recreation Area =

This is a list of the National Register of Historic Places listings in Bighorn Canyon National Recreation Area.

This is intended to be a complete list of the properties and districts on the National Register of Historic Places in Bighorn Canyon National Recreation Area, Montana and Wyoming, United States. The locations of National Register properties and districts for which the latitude and longitude coordinates are included below, may be seen in a Google map.

There are eight properties and districts listed on the National Register in the park.

This National Park Service list is complete through NPS recent listings posted May 1, 2026.

== Current listings ==
	Name on the Register	Image	Date listed	Location	City or town	Description
1	Bad Pass Trail	Bad Pass Trail	October 29, 1975 (#75000215)	East of Warren along the Bighorn River in the Bighorn Canyon National Recreation Area; 45°03′07″N 108°15′44″W	Warren	
2	Bighorn Ditch Headgate	Bighorn Ditch Headgate	December 12, 1976 (#76000174)	West of Fort Smith at the mouth of Bighorn Canyon; 45°18′56″N 107°57′03″W	Fort Smith	
3	Cedarvale	Cedarvale	August 19, 1975 (#75000161)	Present town of Hillsboro and its environs in the Bighorn Canyon National Recreation Area; 45°05′53″N 108°13′26″W	Hillsboro	
4	Ewing-Snell Ranch	Ewing-Snell Ranch	May 12, 1977 (#77000114)	South of Dryhead; 45°05′02″N 108°15′49″W	Dryhead	
5	Fort C.F. Smith Historic District	Fort C.F. Smith Historic District	October 10, 1975 (#75000163)	East of Fort Smith in the Bighorn Canyon National Recreation Area; 45°17′59″N 107°54′59″W	Fort Smith	
6	Caroline Lockhart Ranch	Caroline Lockhart Ranch	November 3, 1989 (#89000155)	Davis Creek, 70 miles south of Hardin; 45°08′17″N 108°14′24″W	Dead Hill	
7	M L Ranch	M L Ranch	July 15, 1992 (#92000836)	Off Alternate U.S. Route 14 near the eastern shore of Bighorn Lake, 13 miles east of Lovell, Bighorn Canyon National Recreation Area; 44°49′49″N 108°09′28″W	Lovell	
8	Pretty Creek Archeological Site		January 17, 1975 (#75000162)	Address Restricted	Hardin	

== See also ==
- National Register of Historic Places listings in Big Horn County, Montana
- National Register of Historic Places listings in Carbon County, Montana
- National Register of Historic Places listings in Big Horn County, Wyoming
- National Register of Historic Places listings in Montana
- National Register of Historic Places listings in Wyoming
