= National Register of Historic Places listings in Big Horn County, Montana =

Location of Big Horn County in Montana

This is a list of the National Register of Historic Places listings in Big Horn County, Montana. It is intended to be a complete list of the properties and districts on the National Register of Historic Places in Big Horn County, Montana, United States. The locations of National Register properties and districts for which the latitude and longitude coordinates are included below, may be seen in a map.

There are 39 properties and districts listed on the National Register in the county, including 2 National Historic Landmarks.

This National Park Service list is complete through NPS recent listings posted December 12, 2025.

== Current listings ==
	Name on the Register	Image	Date listed	Location	City or town	Description
1	Annashisee Iisaxpuatahcheeaashisee-Medicine Wheel on Bighorn River		March 25, 1999 (#99000343)	3 miles (4.8 km) north of Fort Smith on the Bighorn River; 45°20′06″N 107°54′12″W	Fort Smith	
2	Baldwin House		August 3, 1987 (#87001270)	25 3rd Ave. 45°19′02″N 107°22′00″W	Lodge Grass	Demolished
3	Bighorn Ditch Headgate	Bighorn Ditch Headgate	December 12, 1976 (#76000174)	West of Fort Smith at the mouth of Bighorn Canyon; 45°18′56″N 107°57′03″W	Fort Smith	
4	John Boyum House	John Boyum House	April 11, 1991 (#91000371)	225 W. 6th St. 45°44′05″N 107°36′35″W	Hardin	
5	Thomas H. Burke House	Thomas H. Burke House	April 11, 1991 (#91000368)	604 N. Cody; 45°44′04″N 107°36′36″W	Hardin	
6	Cammock's Hotel		August 30, 1987 (#87001271)	28 N. Main St. 45°18′57″N 107°21′49″W	Lodge Grass	Demolished
7	Camp Four		January 21, 1992 (#91001940)	11 miles northeast of Fort Smith on Fort Smith-Hardin County Road; 45°24′50″N 107°53′43″W	Fort Smith	
8	Chief Plenty Coups (Alek-Chea-Ahoosh) House	Chief Plenty Coups (Alek-Chea-Ahoosh) House	October 6, 1970 (#70000354)	1 mile west of Pryor off Montana Highway 416; 45°25′44″N 108°32′45″W	Pryor	
9	Chivers Memorial Church		August 3, 1987 (#87001272)	East of the former CB&Q railroad tracks, along the western side of U.S. Route 87; 45°18′51″N 107°21′40″W	Lodge Grass	Demolished
10	Commercial District	Commercial District	August 14, 1985 (#85001845)	Roughly bounded by 4th, Crook, the Burlington Northern line, 1st and Crow Sts. 45°43′46″N 107°36′30″W	Hardin	
11	J.W. Drew Grain Elevator		August 3, 1987 (#87001274)	Eastern side of Main St. 45°19′02″N 107°21′49″W	Lodge Grass	Demolished
12	William Ebeling House	William Ebeling House	April 11, 1991 (#91000370)	704 N. Crow Ave. 45°44′08″N 107°36′31″W	Hardin	
13	Charles S. Eder House	Charles S. Eder House	April 11, 1991 (#91000374)	416 W. 3rd St. 45°43′53″N 107°36′43″W	Hardin	
14	First Baptist Church	First Baptist Church	April 11, 1991 (#91000369)	524 N. Custer Ave. 45°44′03″N 107°36′26″W	Hardin	
15	Fort C.F. Smith Historic District	Fort C.F. Smith Historic District	October 10, 1975 (#75000163)	East of Fort Smith in the Bighorn Canyon National Recreation Area; 45°17′59″N 107°54′59″W	Fort Smith	
16	Haverfield Hospital	Haverfield Hospital	April 11, 1991 (#91000376)	520 W. 3rd St. 45°43′52″N 107°36′51″W	Hardin	
17	Francis Kopriva House	Francis Kopriva House	April 11, 1991 (#91000377)	416 Crawford Ave. 45°43′58″N 107°36′41″W	Hardin	
18	Lee Homestead		July 8, 1981 (#81000659)	Northeast of Decker in Tongue River Reservoir State Park; 45°08′00″N 106°45′52″W	Decker	Probably demolished.
19	Little Bighorn Battlefield National Monument	Little Bighorn Battlefield National Monument	October 15, 1966 (#66000428)	15 miles south of Hardin; 45°31′20″N 107°22′39″W	Hardin	
20	Lodge Grass City Jail	Lodge Grass City Jail	August 3, 1987 (#87001276)	Alley south of 3rd Ave. 45°19′01″N 107°21′53″W	Lodge Grass	
21	Lodge Grass Merchandise Company Store	Lodge Grass Merchandise Company Store	August 3, 1987 (#87001275)	1st Ave. 45°18′55″N 107°21′54″W	Lodge Grass	
22	Moncure Tipi	Moncure Tipi	December 20, 2002 (#02001547)	Montana Highway 212; 45°31′46″N 106°57′28″W	Busby	
23	OW Ranch		December 15, 1992 (#92001321)	Roughly 15 miles south of Birney on Hanging Woman Creek; 45°08′10″N 106°28′39″W	Birney	
24	George Pease's Second Store		August 3, 1987 (#87001278)	8 N. Main St. 45°18′57″N 107°21′49″W	Lodge Grass	Demolished
25	J.J. Ping House	J.J. Ping House	April 11, 1991 (#91000373)	119 W. 6th St. 45°44′04″N 107°36′26″W	Hardin	
26	Reno Apartments	Reno Apartments	April 11, 1991 (#91000378)	719 N. Custer Ave. 45°44′08″N 107°37′10″W	Hardin	
27	Residential District	Residential District	August 14, 1985 (#85001846)	Roughly bounded by 5th, 4th, Crow, and Cody; 45°43′56″N 107°36′28″W	Hardin	
28	Rosebud Battlefield-Where the Girl Saved Her Brother	Rosebud Battlefield-Where the Girl Saved Her Brother	August 21, 1972 (#72000735)	Montana Highway 314, 12 miles south of Kirby; 45°13′17″N 106°59′21″W	Kirby	
29	John Ryan's House		August 3, 1987 (#87001277)	15 N. Helen St. 45°18′51″N 107°21′50″W	Lodge Grass	Demolished
30	St. Joseph Catholic Church	St. Joseph Catholic Church	April 11, 1991 (#91000379)	710 N. Custer Ave. 45°44′09″N 107°36′26″W	Hardin	
31	St. Xavier Mission Church and Rectory	St. Xavier Mission Church and Rectory	August 17, 1990 (#90001214)	On the Big Horn River in the Crow Indian Reservation; 45°27′48″N 107°43′37″W	St. Xavier	
32	Jay Sharp's Store		August 3, 1987 (#87001279)	18 Helen St. 45°18′53″N 107°21′53″W	Lodge Grass	Demolished
33	Simmonsen's House		August 3, 1987 (#87001273)	4 S. George St. 45°18′49″N 107°22′05″W	Lodge Grass	Demolished
34	Dominic Stevens House	Dominic Stevens House	August 3, 1987 (#87001280)	10 W. Hester Ave. 45°18′49″N 107°22′03″W	Lodge Grass	
35	Sullivan Rooming House	Sullivan Rooming House	April 11, 1991 (#91000372)	217 W. Sixth St. 45°44′05″N 107°36′34″W	Hardin	
36	James J. Sullivan House	James J. Sullivan House	April 11, 1991 (#91000380)	220 W. 3rd St. 45°43′52″N 107°36′32″W	Hardin	
37	J.M. Trytten House		August 3, 1987 (#87001281)	George St. 45°18′50″N 107°22′05″W	Lodge Grass	Demolished
38	J.S. Tupper House	J.S. Tupper House	April 11, 1991 (#91000381)	502 N. Cody; 45°44′01″N 107°36′39″W	Hardin	
39	Alvin Young Barn and Cabin Historic District		January 25, 2011 (#10001188)	Rosebud Battlefield Rd., 3 miles west of MT 314; 45°12′55″N 107°00′22″W	Busby vicinity	

== Former listings ==
	Name on the Register	Image	Date listed	Date removed	Location	City or town	Description
1	Wilber Fish House		April 11, 1991 (#91000375)	April 14, 1992	620 Crow Ave.	Hardin	Delisted due to loss of integrity.

== See also ==
- List of National Historic Landmarks in Montana
- National Register of Historic Places listings in Montana
- Montana History Wiki section on National Register of Historic Places sign texts for Big Horn County.
