= Camp Four =

Camp Four, Camp 4, or Camp IV may refer to:

- Camp 4 (Yosemite), in Yosemite National Park in California
- Camp Four (Fort Smith, Montana), listed on the NRHP in Montana
- Camp Four, California, former name of Camphora, California
- Camp 4, Guantanamo, the camp within the Guantanamo Bay detention camps for the most compliant captives
- Camp IV, on Mount Everest, the final camp on the southern ascent route, on the South Col
