= Kane, Wyoming =

Ghost town in Wyoming, US

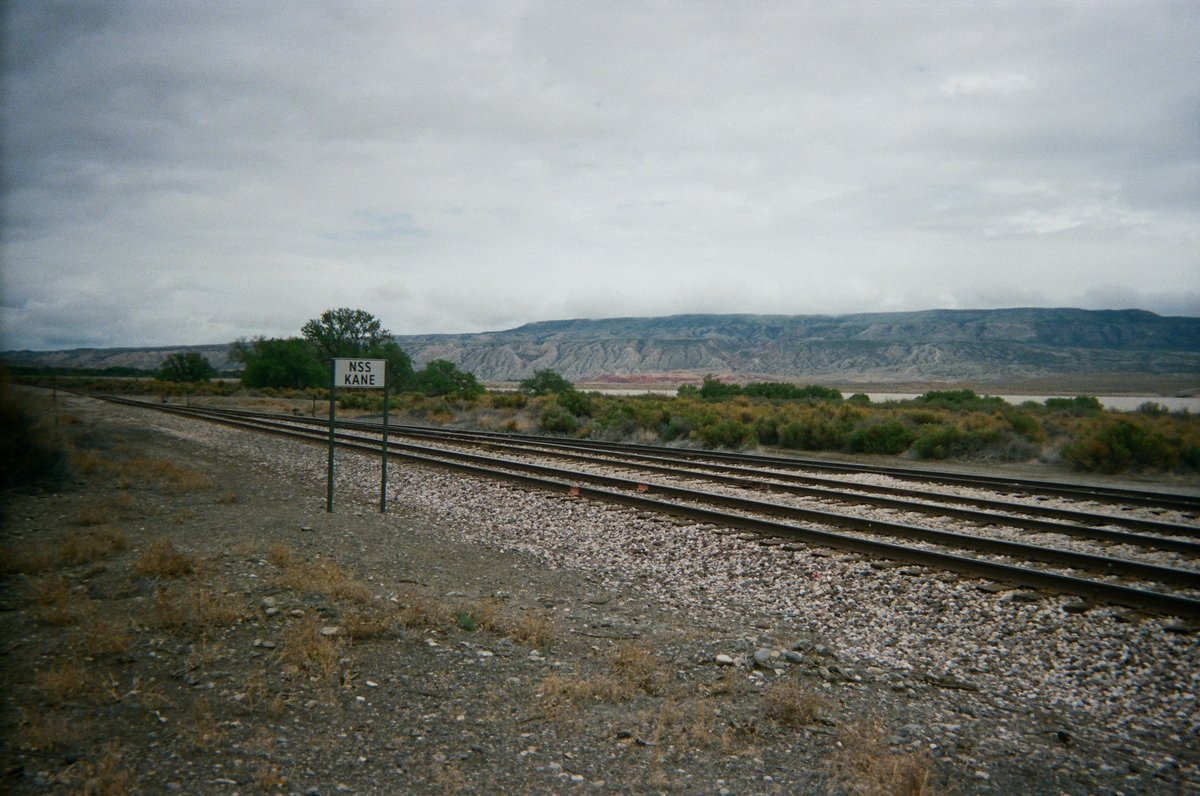
Railroad tracks near Kane, Wyoming

Kane is a ghost town that existed 2 miles (3.2 km) south of the confluence of the Shoshone River and the Bighorn River in Big Horn County, northern Wyoming, United States.

Kane started as a lumber shipping point. In 1832, wagon trains of Captain B.L.E. Bonneville passed through Kane. They were pulled by four mules, four horses, and four oxen. With this route, Bonneville established a trading post near Cody, but abandoned the project due to hostilities with local Indians.

== Submersion ==
Prior to the completion of the Yellowtail Dam in Montana in the 1960s, the residents of Kane sold their homes and land to the federal government. When the dam was completed the area surrounding Kane was flooded by the Bighorn Lake reservoir.

Kane Cemetery 44°53′03″N 108°12′34″W still exists in its original location, 1 mile (1.6 km) north of the rivers' confluence, and now within the Bighorn Canyon National Recreation Area, . Relatives of people buried in the cemetery may continue to be buried there. An idea (considered untrue), gained currency, that the cemetery and its residents were relocated prior to the impoundment of water in the reservoir behind the dam.

== See also ==
- Bighorn Canyon National Recreation Area topics
