= Bighorn Ditch Headgate =

- U.S. National Register of Historic Places
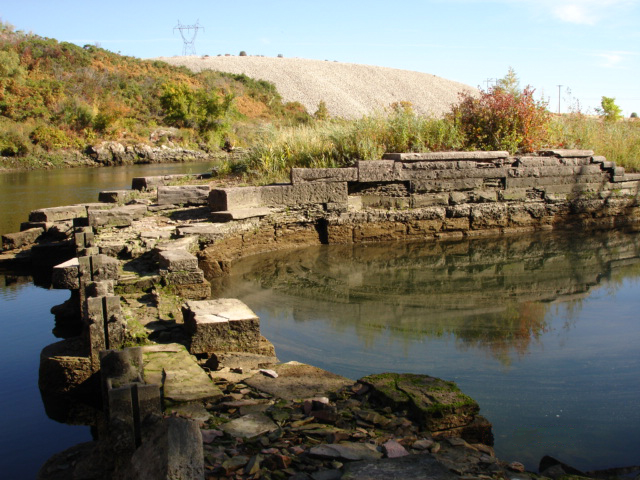

- Location within Montana Location within the United States
- Location: W of Fort Smith at mouth of Bighorn Canyon, Fort Smith, Montana
- Coordinates: 45°18′56″N 107°57′3″W
- Built: 1892
- Architect: Graves, William F.
- NRHP reference No.: 76000174
- Added to NRHP: December 12, 1976

The Bighorn Ditch Headgate, also known as the Bighorn Canal Headgate, was built starting in 1892 to provide irrigation to the Crow Indian Reservation in south central Montana. The headgate structure diverted water from the Bighorn River to their lands. It was designed by William F. Graves, and construction was carried out by Crow workers. The project was completed in 1904. Today the site is included in Bighorn Canyon National Recreation Area.

The structure includes a diversion dam extending at an angle into the river to divert water through the headgate into a canal flowing parallel to the river. The headgate structure was built of dressed local limestone, and is 35 feet (11 m) wide, allowing a designed flow of 720 cubic feet (20,000 L) of water per second. Five iron gates controlled the flow. The headgate structure is intermittently inundated by water held in the Yellowtail Dam Afterbay reservoir.

The Bighorn Ditch was instrumental to the Crow changing from their nomadic lifestyle to a settled, agrarian society. Their initial attempts at farming in the arid climate, beginning in 1885, resulted in failure. The government at last recognized that irrigation of the lands would be required for the people to gain consistent yields from their crops. The 1891 Reno Ditch provided water to 4500 (later 12,500) Crow acres. The Bighorn Ditch allowed the expansion of agriculture and cattle ranching to 35,000 acres (140 km^{2}). As a result, the Crow no longer needed Federal food subsidies.

The Bighorn Ditch headgate was placed on the National Register of Historic Places on December 12, 1976.
