= Camphora =

Camphora may refer to:

- Camphora, a synonym for the chemical compound camphor
- Camphora, California, an unincorporated community in Monterey County
- Camphora (plant), genus of evergreen trees
  - Particularly Camphora officinarum

== See also ==
- Camphor (disambiguation)
