= Thomas D. Campbell =

American farmer and agriculturist

Thomas Campbell
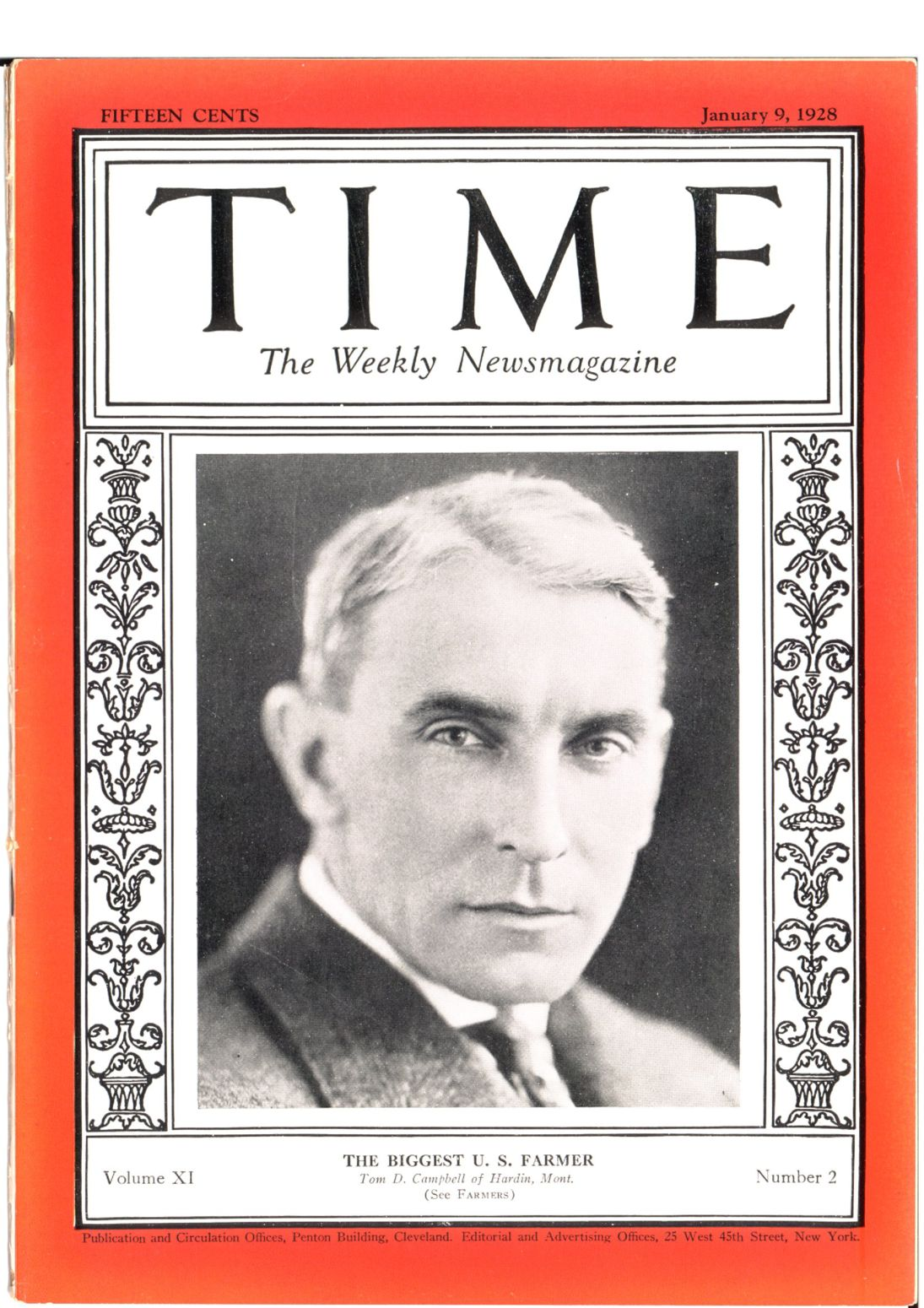
- Time cover, January 1928
- Born: February 19, 1882; Grand Forks, North Dakota
- Died: March 18, 1966 (aged 84); Pasadena, California
- Education: University of North Dakota
- Known for: Farming, Agriculturist

Thomas D. Campbell (1882–1966) was the "World's Wheat King". On the farms of his Campbell Farming Corporation he grew more wheat than any other farmer or corporation. He pioneered industrialized corporate farming. As a consultant in agriculture, he advised the British, French and Soviet governments, including advising Stalin in 1929 on large-scale farming for the Soviet Union's first five-year plan. He served in the U.S. military in World War II and developed the napalm fire bomb used in the Pacific Theatre. He became a brigadier general in the Air Force in 1946.

== Biography ==
Thomas was born Thomas D. Campbell Jr., on February 19, 1882, in North Dakota to Thomas Campbell Sr. and Almira (Richards) Campbell. (Note: The log cabin portion of the Thomas D. Campbell House, in Grand Forks, North Dakota, has been called his birthplace. He was also said to have been born in a sod house in the Red River Valley ().) The couple were of Scottish descent and had immigrated to North Dakota from Perth, Ontario, in 1875. The couple built a log cabin on 80 acres of land that they had purchased. Thomas was valedictorian of Central High School in 1898, attended preparatory school at Upper Canada College, and later graduated from the University of North Dakota. He was the first to graduate in engineering from the latter school, in 1904. In 1906 he married Bess McBride Bull, daughter of George Bull, co-founder of Cream of Wheat, and the couple moved to Pasadena, California.

Soon after arriving in California, Thomas started working for the J.S. Torrance Farming Corporation in California. He later founded the Campbell Farming Corporation. With America's entry into the First World War, Thomas was part of a group of men who believed the slogan that “Food Will Win the War.” Realizing that wheat would be an integral part of this strategy, Campbell presented a plan to the federal government that would use power equipment to cultivate mass acreages of semi-arid land. He was then told to find land suitable for such an undertaking. He selected four large tracts of land on the Shoshone, Blackfoot, Fort Peck, and Crow Indian reservations in Montana and Wyoming. One of the main stipulations of such an agreement was that the tribes would receive ten percent of the crop's cash value. The Crow lands Campbell selected were bench land on the western side of the Bighorn River and south of Beauvais Creek. He acquired $2,000,000 financing from J.P. Morgan and began farming 200,000 acres (81,000 ha) on the Crow Indian Reservation north of the Big Horn River in Montana.

The Thomas D. Campbell House, his childhood home, is listed on the U.S. National Register of Historic Places.

== See also ==
- Gigant (Sovkhoz)
- Camp Four, a historic site on the U.S. National Register of Historic Places, preserves one of two permanent workcamps, which along with six temporary camps, served one of Campbell's farms during the period from 1920 to the 1960s.
