= Downtown Commercial Historic District =

Downtown Commercial Historic District or Downtown Historic District may refer to:

- Downtown Commercial District (Bowling Green, Kentucky)
- Downtown Commercial Historic District (Burlington, Iowa), listed on the National Register of Historic Places
- Downtown Commercial District (Lexington, Kentucky), listed on the National Register of Historic Places
- Downtown Commercial Historic District (Muscatine, Iowa)
- Downtown Commercial Historic District (Paterson, New Jersey)

== See also ==
- Commercial Historic District (disambiguation)
