= Cedarvale (Hillsboro, Montana) =

- U.S. National Register of Historic Places
- U.S. Historic district
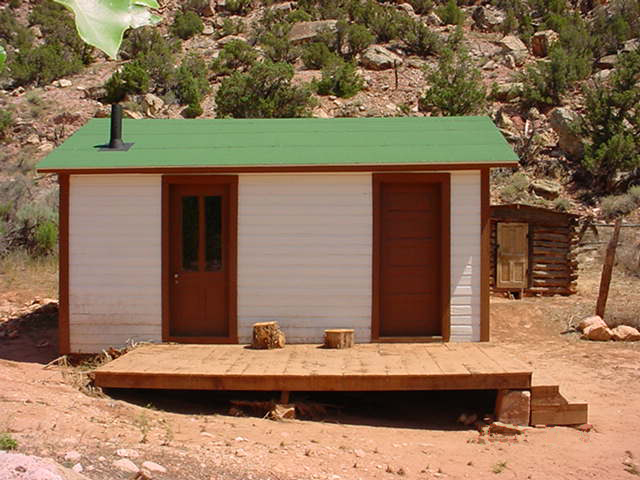
- Hulbert's Cabin, Cedarvale

- Location within Montana Location within the United States
- Nearest city: Hillsboro, Montana
- Coordinates: 45°05′53″N 108°13′26″W
- Area: 165 acres (67 ha)
- Built: 1903
- NRHP reference No.: 75000161
- Added to NRHP: August 19, 1975

Cedarvale, also known as Hillsboro Ranch, was a dude ranch and working ranch in Carbon County, southern Montana, United States. The ranch was established about 1903 by prospector Grosvener W. Barry on the South Fork Trail Creek. Barry used the ranch as a home for his family and as a base for his mining ventures, all of which failed. His most lucrative venture was the conversion of Cedarvale from a working ranch to a dude ranch, marketed through an arrangement with the Chicago, Burlington and Quincy Railroad. It was the first dude ranch in the area. Barry introduced powered boats to the Bighorn River to carry dudes to the ranch from the railhead at Kane, Wyoming. As a publicity stunt Barry, his stepson and a neighbor piloted the 16-foot (4.9 m) motorized Edith from the Hillsboro landing down the Bighorn, Yellowstone, Missouri and Mississippi rivers, leaving on May 31, 1913 and arriving in New Orleans on August 1. One of Barry's boats, the Hillmont, is on display at Barry's Landing.

== Doc Barry ==
Grosvener W. Barry started life in New York and moved west with his wife Edith and her son from a previous marriage, Claude St. John. Known as "Doc”, Barry promoted a number of mining schemes. His most ambitious effort raised $50,000 to ship a gold dredge to work a claim on the Bighorn River at the mouth of Trail Creek, which never recovered its costs. Barry died in Billings, Montana of a brain tumor on January 25, 1920. Edith and Claude St. John continued to manage the dude ranch after his death. The ranch eventually reverted to a working cattle ranch, continuing into the late 1950s

== Description ==
The historic district comprises what amounts to a small town, including the 1-1/2 story log Hillsboro Post Office, the log Big Chicken House, the Small Chicken House, a milk house and a root cellar. Hulbert's Shop and the Dude Cabin are in two sections of the same small log structure. A barn, corral, and the Hulbert Cabin complete the ensemble. Nearly all of the buildings had sod roofs. The post office opened in 1915 and lasted until 1945. The main ranch house burned during the winter of 1947-48, and its replacement burned some years later.

Cedarvale was listed on the National Register of Historic Places on August 19, 1975. It is a preserved area within Bighorn Canyon National Recreation Area. The Barry's landing area of the park continues the Barry name.
