= Ewing-Snell Ranch =

Historic house in Montana, United States

- U.S. National Register of Historic Places
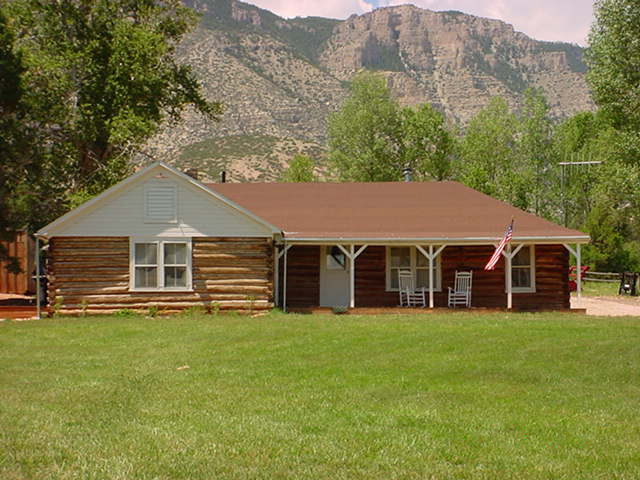
- Ewing-Snell ranch house

- Location within Montana Location within the United States
- Nearest city: Dryhead, Montana
- Coordinates: 45°5′2″N 108°15′49″W
- Area: 1 acre (0.40 ha)
- Built: 1896
- Built by: Erastus T. Ewing
- NRHP reference No.: 77000114
- Added to NRHP: May 12, 1977

The Ewing-Snell Ranch was established between 1896 and 1898 by Erastus Ewing in Carbon County, Montana, on Layout Creek between Bighorn Canyon and the Pryor Mountains in a region called Dryhead Country. Ewing took up ranching after failing as a gold miner.

Erastus Ewing was born in Tennessee about 1846, arriving in Montana in the 1880s to look for gold. He staked numerous claims, one of which controlled the water rights for Layout Creek. After giving up prospecting, he used the rights to establish his ranch, digging a ditch to his homestead from the creek.

Ewing's place was designated a post office in 1898, operating until 1906 as Ewing, Montana before moving to the Caroline Lockhart Ranch. Erastus died in 1904. His son Lee sold the ranch to Clint Hough in 1911, who sold it to Philip Snell in 1918. The shop building operated as the Dryhead School in 1945–1957. Snell's descendants sold the ranch to Newell K. Sorenson in 1964. Sorenson sold 640 acres (260 ha) to the Bureau of Reclamation for the construction of Yellowtail Dam in 1968. The ranch is part of Bighorn Canyon National Recreation Area.

The Ewing-Snell Ranch was placed on the National Register of Historic Places on May 12, 1977.
