= Commercial Historic District =

Commercial Historic District or Commercial District may refer to:

- Commercial Historic District (Potlatch, Idaho), listed on the NRHP in Idaho
- Commercial Historic District (Pikeville, Kentucky), listed on the NRHP in Kentucky
- Commercial Community Historic District, Lexington, Missouri, listed on the NRHP in Missouri
- Commercial District (Hardin, Montana), listed on the NRHP in Montana
- Commercial District (Livingston, Montana), listed on the NRHP in Montana

Note there are numerous NRHP-listed historic districts of name format "TOWN-OR-CITY Commercial Historic District".

== See also ==
- Downtown Commercial Historic District (disambiguation)
- Commercial Street Historic District (disambiguation)
