= Caroline Lockhart =

American author and rancher (1871–1962)

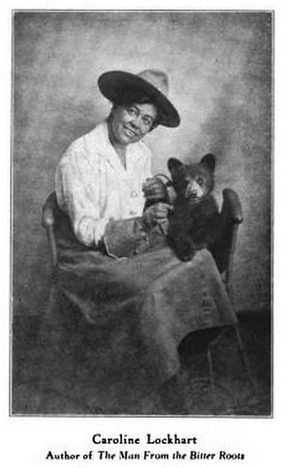
- Born: Caroline Cameron Lockhart; February 24, 1871; Eagle Point Township, Ogle County, Illinois, US
- Died: July 25, 1962 (aged 91)
- Occupations: Journalist, author, newspaper publisher, rodeo promoter, rancher

Caroline Cameron Lockhart (February 24, 1871 – July 25, 1962) was an American journalist, author, newspaper publisher, rodeo promoter and rancher. Along with Buffalo Bill and Senator Alan Kooi Simpson, she is one of the most famous citizens of Cody, Wyoming.

== Biography ==
Caroline Lockhart was born in Eagle Point Township, Ogle County, Illinois on February 24, 1871. She grew up on a ranch in Kansas. She attended Bethany College in Topeka, Kansas and the Moravian Seminary in Bethlehem, Pennsylvania.

A failed actress, she became a reporter for The Boston Post and later for the Philadelphia Bulletin. She also started writing short stories. In 1904, she moved to Cody, Wyoming to write a feature article about the Blackfoot Indians, and settled there. She started writing novels and her second novel, The Lady Doc, was based on life in Cody. In 1918–1919, she lived in Denver, Colorado and worked as a reporter for The Denver Post. In 1919, her novel The Fighting Shepherdess, loosely based on the life of sheepherder Lucy Morrison Moore, was made into a 1920 movie starring Anita Stewart, with uncredited script adaptation by Lenore J. Coffee. So was her early novel, The Man from Bitter Roots (1916). She also met with Douglas Fairbanks about adapting The Dude Wrangler, which was filmed in 1930.

Lockhart became a big promoter of the western way of life in general and of Cody, WY, in particular. From 1920 to 1925, she owned the newspaper Park County Enterprise, and it was renamed the Cody Enterprise in 1921. From 1920 to 1926, she helped found and then served as President of the board of the Cody Stampede, an annual rodeo. Lockhart and her colleagues saw the national and international reputation of Buffalo Bill (William F. Cody) as an asset and worked to connect the town to him and to keep alive his reputation as popular western figure.

In 1926, she bought a ranch in Dryhead, Montana, now part of the Bighorn Canyon National Recreation Area where she lived until 1950. She still spent her winters in Cody, where she eventually retired. She died on July 25, 1962. The Caroline Lockhart Ranch was listed on the National Register of Historic Places in 1989 and its structures were restored by the National Park Service. In 2018, the National Cowgirl Museum and Hall of Fame inducted her.

== Bibliography ==
=== Novels ===
- Me-Smith (1911)
- The Lady Doc (1912)
- The Full of the Moon (1914)
- The Man From Bitter Roots (1915)
- The Fighting Shepherdess (1919)
- The Dude Wrangler (1921)
- The Old West and the New (1933)

== Secondary sources ==
- Hicks, Lucille Patrick. Caroline Lockhart: Liberated Lady (Pioneer Printing, 1984)
- Yates, Norris. Caroline Lockhart (Boise State University Western Writers Series, 1994)
- Furman, Necah Stewart. Caroline Lockhart: Her Life and Legacy (University of Washington Press, 1994)
- Nicholas, Liza. Becoming Western: Stories of Culture And Identity in the Cowboy State (University of Nebraska Press, 2006)
- Clayton, John. The Cowboy Girl: The Life of Caroline Lockhart (University of Nebraska Press, 2007)
