= Caroline Lockhart Ranch =

- U.S. National Register of Historic Places
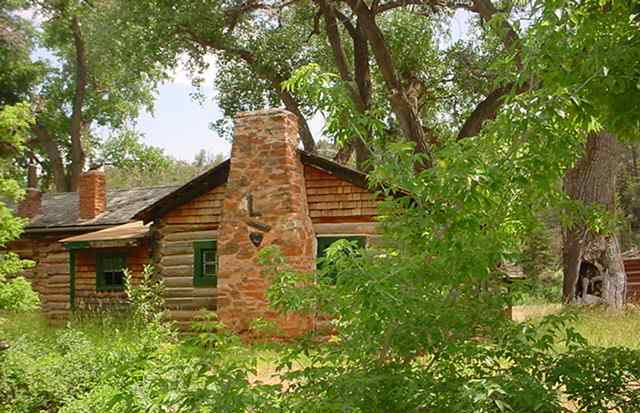
- Lockhart ranch house

- Location within Montana Location within the United States
- Location: Davis Creek, 70 mi. S of Hardin, Dead Hill, Montana
- Coordinates: 45°8′17″N 108°14′24″W
- Area: 7 acres (2.8 ha)
- Built by: Caroline Lockhart
- NRHP reference No.: 89000155
- Added to NRHP: November 3, 1989

The Caroline Lockhart Ranch was established in 1926 by Caroline Lockhart, who purchased a 160-acre (65 ha) homestead near Davis Creek at the foot of the Pryor Mountains in Carbon County, Montana, while in her fifties. Lockhart expanded the ranch, adding buildings, land and grazing rights until the ranch comprised about 7,000 acres (2,800 ha). The region, known as Dryhead Country, is one of the most isolated places in Montana.

Caroline Cameron Lockhart was a writer in Philadelphia, who worked as a reporter in Philadelphia and Boston, specializing in investigative reporting. Born in Illinois in 1871, she had grown up on a ranch in Kansas. Lockhart moved to Cody, Wyoming in 1904, writing novels, screenplays and working for the Denver Post. She bought the Cody newspaper, the Park County Enterprise, renaming it the Cody Enterprise in 1921, and selling it in 1925. In 1926 she bought the ranch, living at the L/♥ in the summers and in Cody in the winter. She moved back to Cody in 1950 as her health declined, selling the ranch.

The Tippetts family bought the ranch from Lockhart in 1955, primarily for the land rights. The structures were left to deteriorate. In 1980 the property was acquired by the National Park Service and incorporated into Bighorn Canyon National Recreation Area. The structures have been restored by the Park Service as nearly unique examples of local ranching culture and vernacular construction.

== Description ==
The main ranch house was built by Lockhart using hired labor, adding to a cabin built by the previous owners. The rambling log and stone house with a sod roof was completed around 1938, eventually comprising twelve rooms. Other structures include a guest cabin, a bunkhouse -storehouse, a spring house, and stables and barns.

The Caroline Lockhart Ranch was placed on the National Register of Historic Places on November 3, 1989. The present property comprises 6 acres (2.4 ha), the core of the ranch.
