= The Man from Bitter Roots =

1916 film

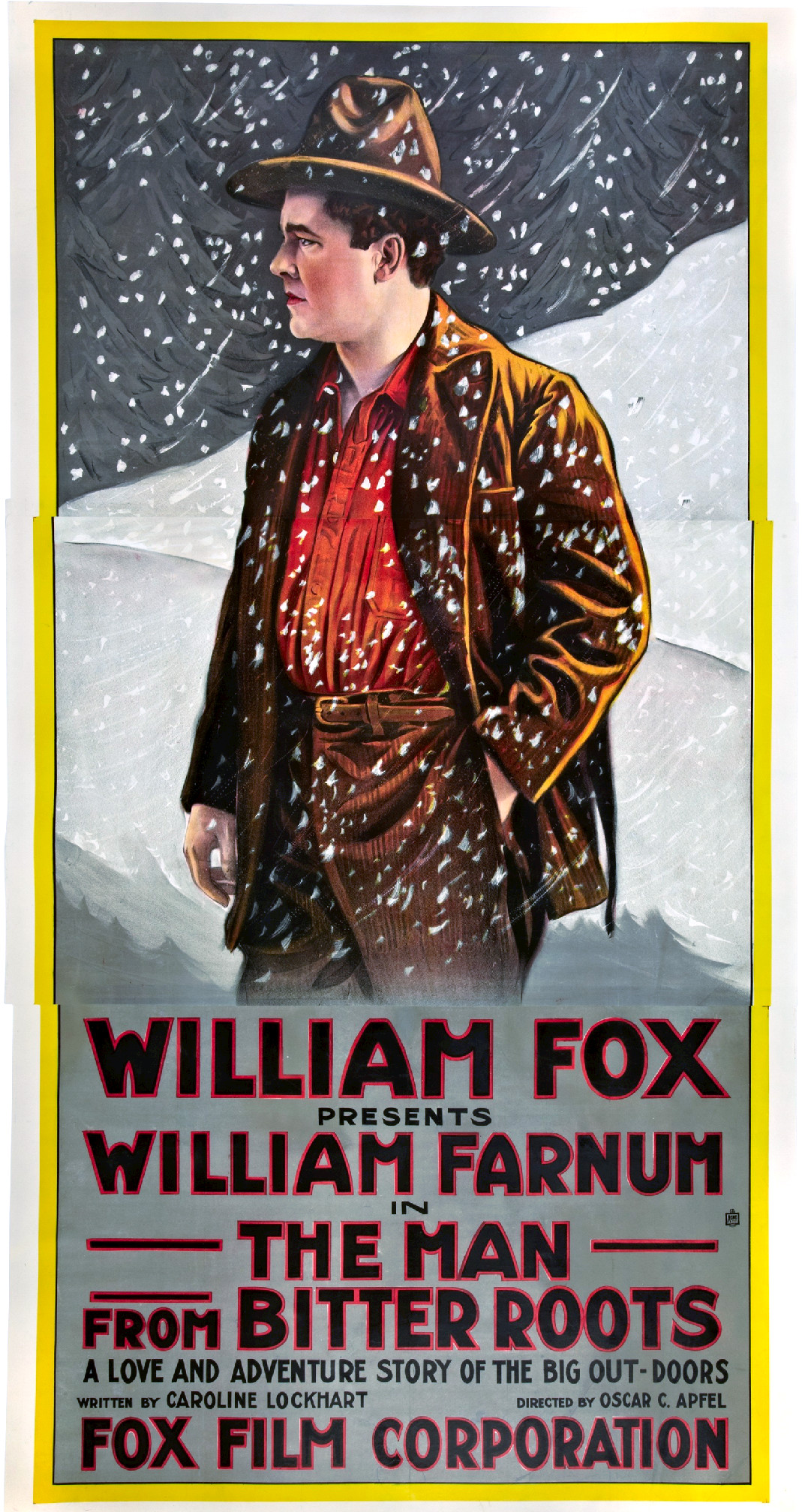
- Film poster
- Directed by: Oscar Apfel
- Written by: Oscar Apfel
- Based on: novel The Man from Bitter Roots by Caroline Lockhart
- Produced by: William Fox
- Starring: William Farnum; Slim Whitaker
- Cinematography: Alfredo Gandolfi; Harry W. Gerstad; J. C. Cook
- Distributed by: Fox Film
- Release date: 3 July 1916
- Running time: 50 minutes
- Country: United States
- Languages: Silent; English intertitles

The Man from Bitter Roots is a lost 1916 American silent Western film directed by Oscar Apfel and starring William Farnum. It was produced and released by the Fox Film Corporation.

== Cast ==
- William Farnum - Bruce Burt
- Slim Whitaker - 'Slim' Naudain
- Henry A. Barrows - T. Victor Sprudell
- Willard Louis - J. Winfield Harrah
- William Burress - Toy
- Harry De Vere
- Betty Schade
- Betty Harte
