= The Fighting Shepherdess =

1920 film directed by Edward José

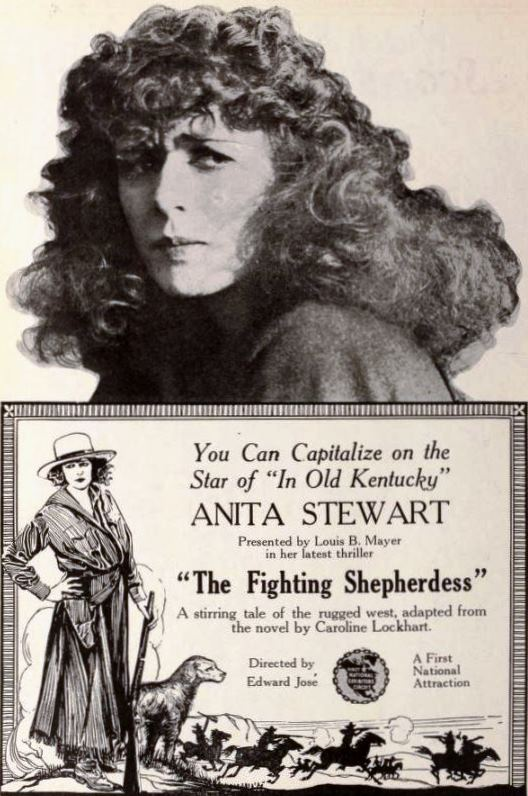
- Directed by: Edward José; Millard Webb
- Screenplay by: Frank Mitchell Dazey
- Based on: The Fighting Shepherdess by Caroline Lockhart
- Produced by: Louis B. Mayer; Anita Stewart
- Starring: Anita Stewart; Wallace MacDonald; Noah Beery; Walter Long; Eugenie Besserer; John Hall
- Cinematography: Tony Gaudio
- Production companies: Anita Stewart Productions; Louis B. Mayer Productions
- Distributed by: First National Exhibitors' Circuit
- Release date: March 1, 1920
- Running time: 50 minutes
- Country: United States
- Language: Silent (English intertitles)

The Fighting Shepherdess is a 1920 American silent Western-romance film directed by Edward José and Millard Webb and written by Frank Mitchell Dazey. It is based on the 1919 novel The Fighting Shepherdess by Caroline Lockhart. The film stars Anita Stewart, Wallace MacDonald, Noah Beery, Walter Long, Eugenie Besserer and John Hall. The film was released on March 1, 1920, by First National Exhibitors' Circuit.

== Cast ==
- Anita Stewart as Kate Prentice
- Wallace MacDonald as Hughie
- Noah Beery as Mormon Joe
- Walter Long as Pete Mullendore
- Eugenie Besserer as Jezebel
- John Hall as Tetters
- Gibson Gowland as Bowers
- Calvert Carter as Mayor
- Billie DeVail as Banker
- Maude Wayne as Beth
- Ben Lewis as Lingle
- Will Jeffries as The Engineer

== Censorship ==
Before The Fighting Shepherdess could be exhibited in Kansas, the Kansas Board of Review required the removal of several scenes, including all scenes of drinking and drunk people. Other eliminations were the scene of a mixed-race man attacks a woman and the intertitle "Katie you'll make a fine squaw for some feller, you're sure takin' on shape."

== Preservation ==
With no holdings located in archives, The Fighting Shepherdess is considered a lost film.
