= Camphor (disambiguation) =

Camphor is a chemical compound.

Camphor may also refer to:

- Camphor (album), a 2002 David Sylvian album
- Camphor Hall, a residence hall at Dillard University, named in honor of Alexander Priestly Camphor
- Alexander Priestly Camphor (1865–1919), American Missionary Bishop of the Methodist Episcopal Church and namesake of Camphor Hall
- Camphor tree, a common name for the evergreen Camphora officinarum
- Camphor (restaurant), a Michelin-starred restaurant in Southern California

== See also ==
- Camphora (disambiguation)
- Kämpfer, a Japanese light novel series
