= Thomas D. Campbell House =

Historic house in North Dakota, United States

- U.S. National Register of Historic Places
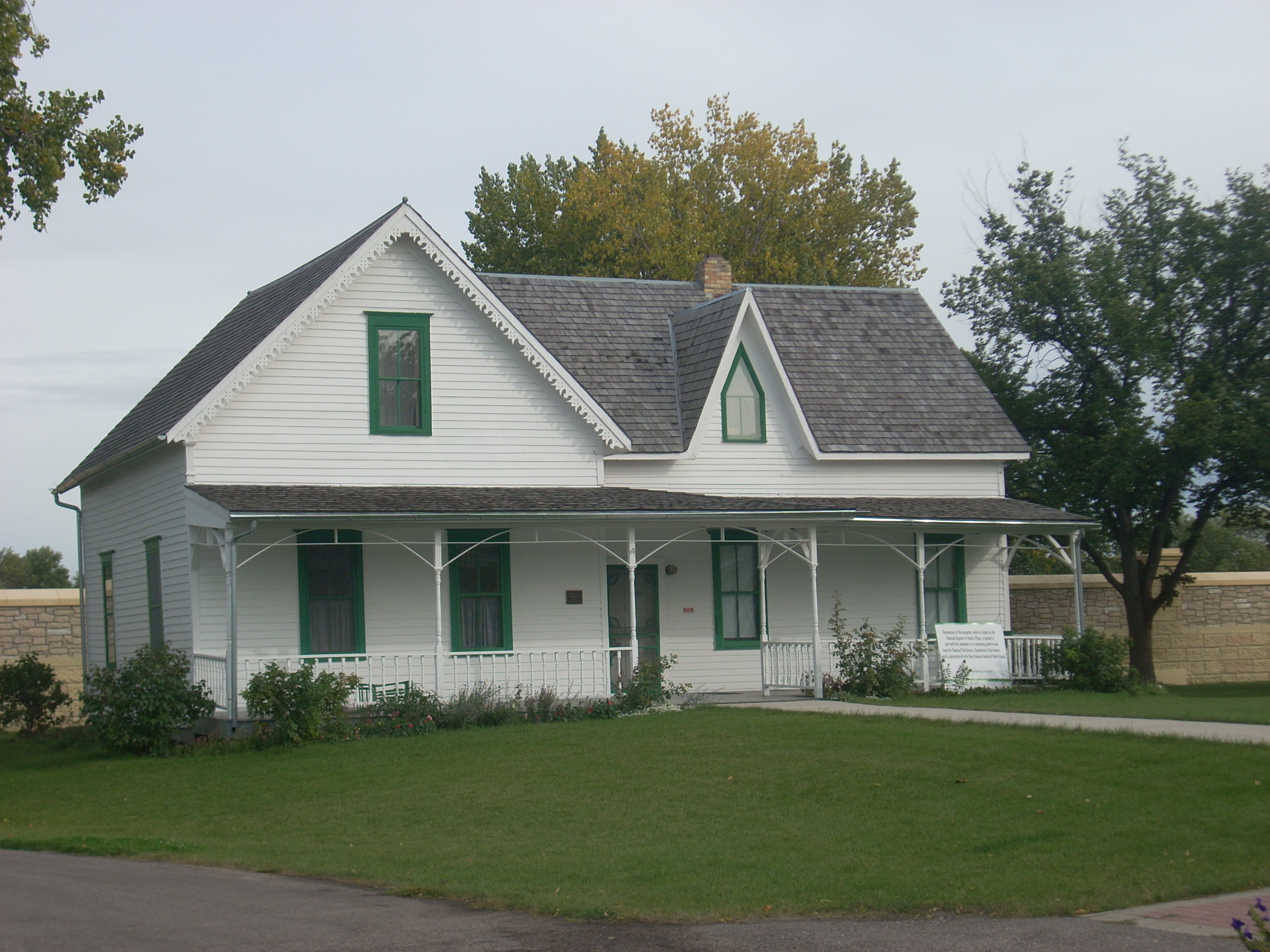

- Location within North Dakota Location within the United States
- Location: 2405 Belmont Rd., Grand Forks, North Dakota
- Coordinates: 47°53′47″N 97°1′38″W
- Area: less than one acre
- Built: 1879
- Architectural style: Gothic Revival
- NRHP reference No.: 87002010
- Added to NRHP: September 29, 1987

The Thomas D. Campbell House is a historic Gothic Revival style log and wood frame home located in Grand Forks, North Dakota. It is significant for its association with Thomas D. Campbell, who became the largest wheat farmer in the United States. It is part of the Myra Museum and is listed on the National Register of Historic Places.

Built in 1879 for Thomas D. Campbell, the house consists of the original 1879 log cabin enclosed within a later Gothic Revival wood-frame addition, which is dated to ca. 1881–1900, with an overall L-shaped floor plan. The home has gabled roofs and clapboard siding. The main facade and south gables are distinguished by lace bargeboards, and the west gable contains a pointed window. A porch extends across the west facade and is supported by turned posts and bentwood arches. It is the only building remaining from the Campbell family's pioneer farmstead.

The interior of the house serves as a museum, and is fitted out with turn of the 20th century furnishings befitting a family residence. The chinked log walls and hand-hewn loft joists of the original 1879 log cabin are exposed from within.

At the time of its construction the Campbell house was south of the tiny settlement of Grand Forks; it was one of a string of pioneer homes along the Red River, with no other buildings in its immediate area. Associated with the First Dakota Boom and the pre-railroad (pre-1880) era, it is a significant example of the architecture of this period. Log structures were popular at this time due to the expense of hauling cut lumber down the river from the railhead in Fargo. The practice of constructing a fairly simple log home, to be supplanted or engulfed later on by a more substantial structure, appears to have been fairly common to the area at this time. The house is notable for being the only Gothic Revival farmhouse in Grand Forks and one of only a few houses of this style in North Dakota's Red River Valley region, and at the time of its enlargement was one of the finer homes in the area.

== The Campbell family ==
Thomas D. and Almira Richards Campbell, immigrants from Scotland and Canada, began their lives in the Red River Valley with a small farm. This grew to include 4,000 acres (16 km^{2}) of excellent crop land by 1898. By the turn of the 20th century Mr. Campbell had become a prominent real estate man in the city.

The log portion of the home was the birthplace of General Thomas D. Campbell (1882–1966), who was known as the "Wheat King" and owned large tracts of land in Montana and New Mexico. Gen. Campbell was at one time the nation's largest wheat producer, and served in both World War I and World War II. During the latter he developed a napalm firebomb used widely in the Pacific Theater.

== See also ==
- Camp Four, National Register-listed wheat farming bunkhouses and associated buildings, on Campbell Farm
