= Bad Pass Trail =

- U.S. National Register of Historic Places
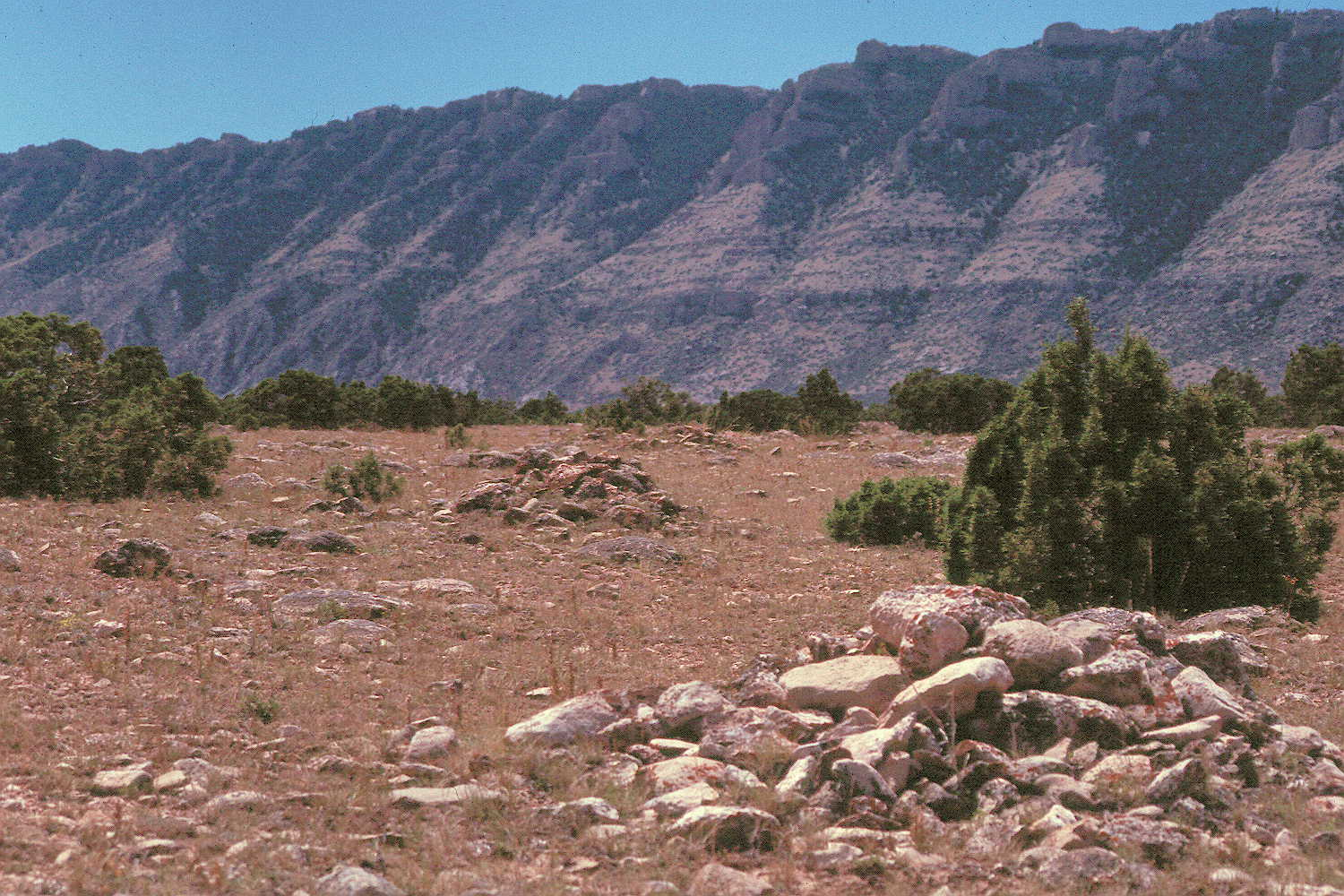
- Rock cairn on the Bad Pass Trail, Montana

- Location within Montana Location within the United States
- Nearest city: Lovell, Wyoming
- Coordinates: 45°0′16.55″N 108°16′35.90″W
- Area: 5,372.3 acres (2,174.1 ha)
- NRHP reference No.: 75000215
- Added to NRHP: October 29, 1975

The Bad Pass Trail, also known as the Sioux Trail, was established by Native Americans on the border of present-day Montana and Wyoming as a means of access from the Bighorn Basin in Wyoming to Bison-hunting grounds in the Grapevine Creek area of Montana. Marked by stone cairns, the trail led across Bad Pass and was established in pre-Columbian times. After Europeans arrived in the area it was frequented by fur trappers and mountain men, beginning in 1824. Trappers assembled pack trains at the junction of the Shoshone River and the Bighorn River, using the Bad Pass Trail to avoid Bighorn Canyon. The trail ended at the mouth of Grapevine Creek on the Bighorn, from which the pack train could float down the Bighorn on rafts to the Yellowstone River and then to the Missouri and on to St. Louis.

Approximately three hundred cairns are known to exist along the trail, particularly in Bighorn Canyon National Recreation Area. The cairns are believed to have been built incrementally, with passer-by placing stones on the pile as a good luck offering. Much of the trail itself has been altered beyond recognition by the construction of an access road for area ranches. The trail runs along the western side of Bighorn Canyon. It is estimated to have been in use for ten to twelve thousand years. The trail features as many as one thousand tipi rings on either side of the trail, some of which have been evaluated by archeologists.

The Bad Pass Trail was placed on the National Register of Historic Places on October 29, 1975.
