= Commercial Street Historic District =

Commercial Street Historic District may refer to:

- Commercial Street Historic District (Mingo Junction, Ohio), listed on the NRHP in Ohio, U.S.
- Commercial Street Historic District (Springfield, Missouri), listed on the NRHP in Missouri, U.S.
- Salem Downtown State Street – Commercial Street Historic District, listed on the NRHP in Salem, Oregon, U.S.

== See also ==
- Commercial Historic District (disambiguation)
- Commercial Street (disambiguation)
