= M L Ranch =

- U.S. National Register of Historic Places
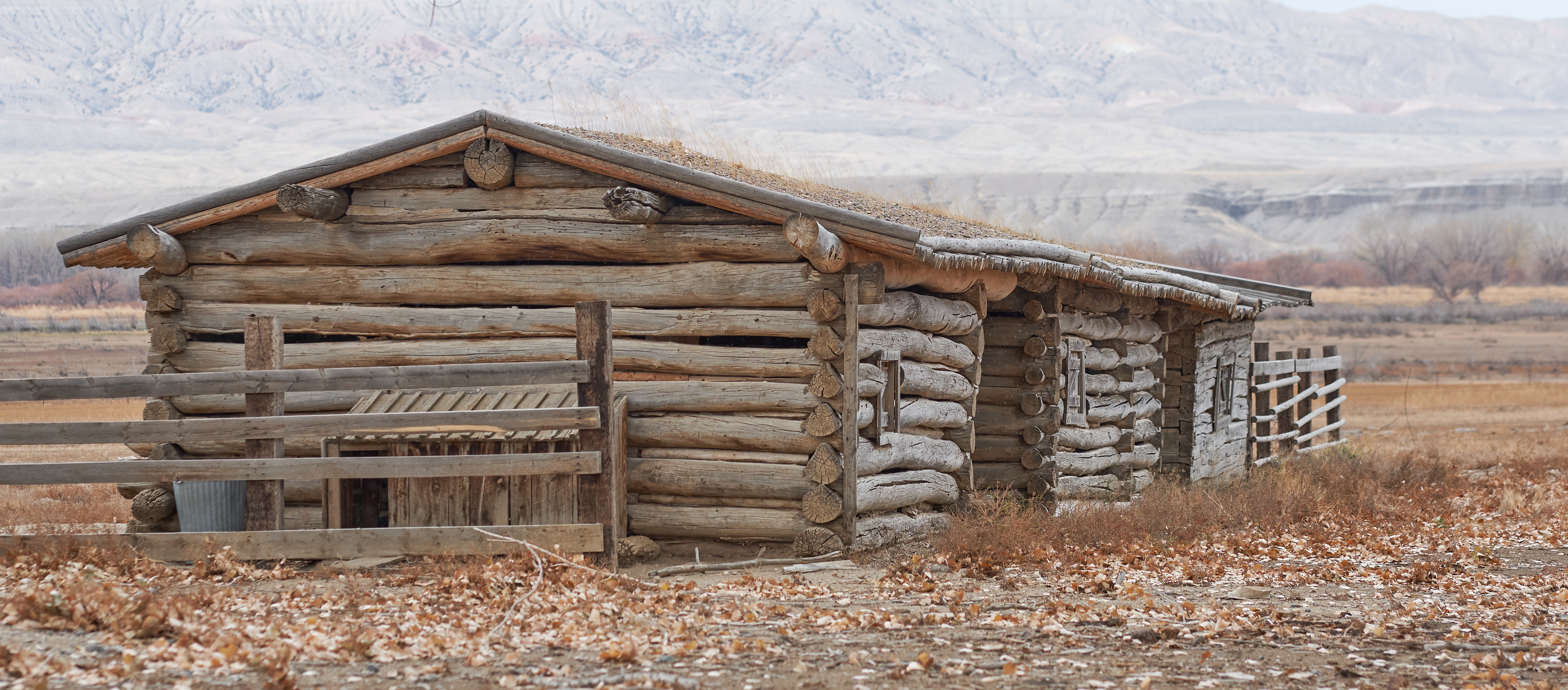
- M L Ranch bunkhouse

- Location within Wyoming Location within the United States
- Nearest city: Lovell, Wyoming
- Coordinates: 44°49′49″N 108°9′28″W
- Area: 5.7 acres (2.3 ha)
- Built: 1883
- Built by: Henry Clay Lovell
- NRHP reference No.: 92000836
- Added to NRHP: July 15, 1992

The M L Ranch was established by Henry Clay Lovell and his financial backer Anthony Mason in Wyoming's Big Horn Basin in the late 1870s to the south of the present location. The second and final location was established farther north as a cattle line camp in 1883 to be closer to markets in Billings, Montana. In 1884 it became the headquarters for a ranch that reached 25,000 acres (10,000 ha) in area. The bad winter of 1886–87 killed half the livestock on the ranch, more than 10,000 head., but the M L fared better than most. Mason died in 1892. Lovell died in Oregon in 1903. Lovell, Wyoming was named in his memory. The Lovell family ran the ranch until 1909. In the early 1960s the ranch was purchased by the Bureau of Reclamation as part of the Bighorn Lake reservoir project. In 1966 the headquarters site was transferred to the National Park Service as part of Bighorn Canyon National Recreation Area.

The M L Ranch was listed on the National Register of Historic Places on July 15, 1992.
