= Commercial Street =

Commercial Street may refer to:

- Commercial Street (San Francisco), California, U.S.
- Commercial Street, Bengaluru, India
- Commercial Street, Leeds, England
- Commercial Street, London, England
- Commercial Street, Newport, Wales
- Commercial Street, Portland, Maine, U.S.
- Commercial Street, Sheffield, England

== See also ==
- Commercial Drive, located in Vancouver, British Columbia, Canada
- Commercial Street Historic District (disambiguation), several places in the United States
