= Chivers Memorial Church =

Historic church in Montana, United States

- U.S. National Register of Historic Places
- Location within Montana Location within the United States
- Location: East of Chicago Burlington RR tracks, west side of US 87, Lodge Grass, Montana
- Coordinates: 45°18′51″N 107°21′40″W
- Area: less than one acre
- Built: 1927-28
- Built by: Pease, George, Jr.; others
- MPS: Lodge Grass MRA
- NRHP reference No.: 87001272
- Added to NRHP: August 3, 1987

The Chivers Memorial Church in Lodge Grass, Montana is a historic church complex built during 1927–28. It is located east of the former CB&Q railroad tracks, along the western side of U.S. Route 87. It was listed on the National Register of Historic Places in 1987. According to a Montana historic site inventory, it was then owned by the National Ministries of American Baptists, headquartered in Valley Forge, Pennsylvania.

The complex, all under one roof, includes a gable-ended, wood-frame church building with a central bell tower, a council lodge hall, a Sunday-school room, and a parsonage.

The church replaced the former 1904-built Baptist missionary which was destroyed in a fire in 1926. Reverend Petsholdt raised funds for its construction. Crow Indian children had been allowed to attend regular schools since 1921, so it was not necessary to rebuild the mission school.

The church was considered a church for Native Americans only, as a different Baptist church for whites was built in 1917. The council lodge space was the largest meeting space in Lodge Grass, however, and was used for high school graduations, town meetings, and social events for over 60 years.

It was built by volunteers under supervision of George Pease, Jr.
