= Cody Enterprise =

Newspaper in Cody, Wyoming, US

- Type: Twice weekly newspaper
- Founder(s): Buffalo Bill and John Peake
- Publisher: Megan Barton
- Founded: 1899
- Language: English
- Headquarters: PO BOX 1090 Cody, WY 82414
- Circulation: 4,675
- Website: codyenterprise.com

The Cody Enterprise is a newspaper in Cody, Wyoming. It is published twice weekly. The Enterprise has a circulation of over 4,000 between print and electronic memberships.

== History ==
The newspaper was established by Buffalo Bill and John Peake in 1899. The first issue appeared on August 31, 1899, and it was firmly established in 1902. In 1904, it was bought by Caroline Lockhart, a Prohibition crusader and novelist originally from Boston. She served as owner and editor from 1904 to 1962.

In the summer of 1936, the paper featured articles about artists Edward Thomas Grigware and Stan Kershaw. The Enterprise was purchased by Sage Publishing Company in 1972 before it was bought by independent publisher J. Louie Mullen of Buffalo, Wyoming in 2022.

In August 2024, a reporter for the Enterprise was caught using artificial intelligence to create news stories and fabricate quotes, including fake statements from Wyoming governor Mark Gordon. The journalist responsible for the stories resigned and the publisher created an official AI policy to prevent similar issues.
