= Eagle Point Township, Illinois =

Eagle Point Township
- Township
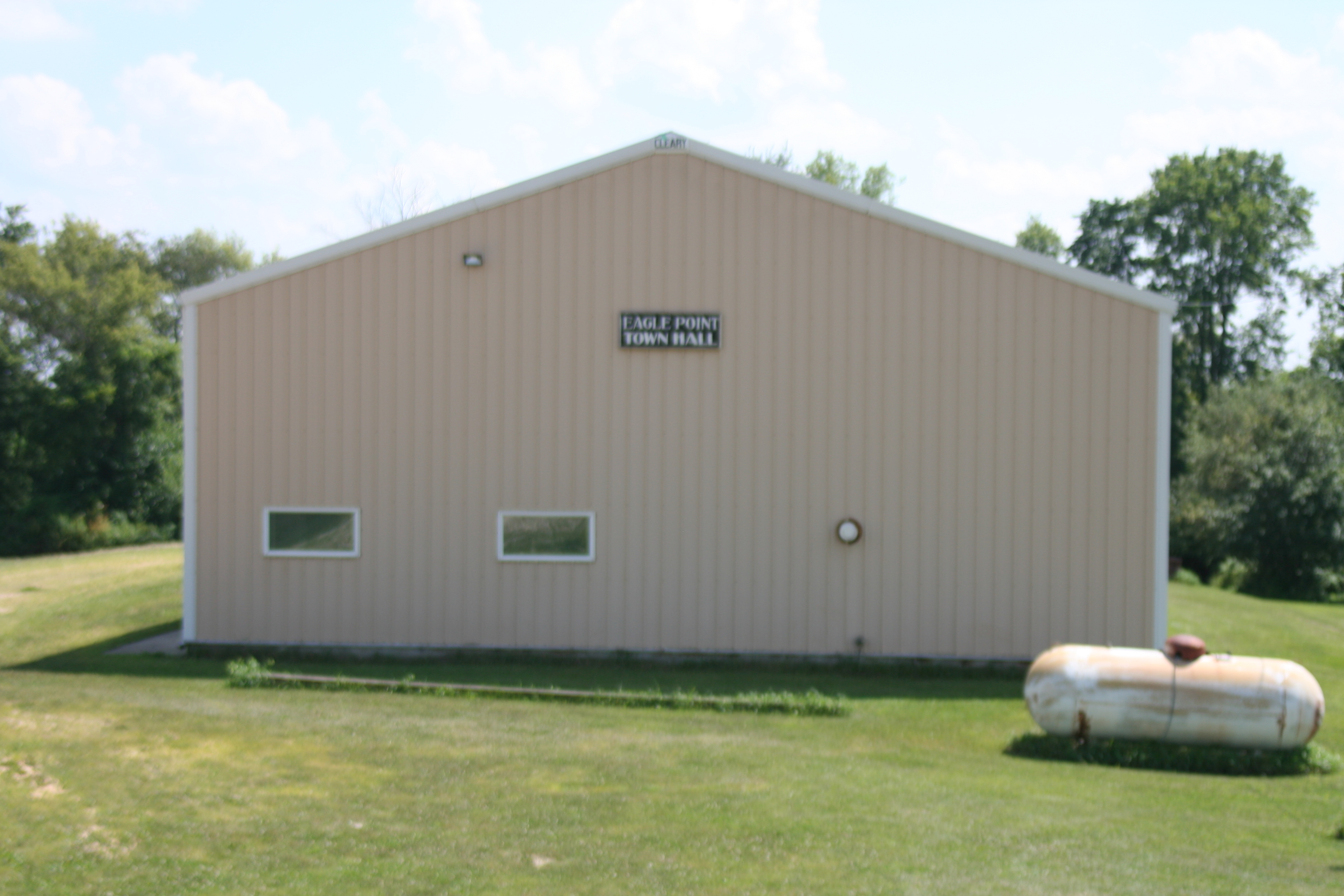
- Town hall in Hazelhurst

- Location in Ogle County
- Coordinates: 41°58′38″N 89°39′27″W
- Country: United States
- State: Illinois
- County: Ogle
- Established: September 1869

Government
  - Supervisor: Elizabeth Itnyre

Area
  - Total: 19.57 sq mi (50.7 km^{2})
  - Land: 19.57 sq mi (50.7 km^{2})
  - Water: 0 sq mi (0 km^{2}) 0%
- Elevation: 899 ft (274 m)

Population (2010)
  - Estimate (2016): 218
  - Density: 11.6/sq mi (4.5/km^{2})
- Time zone: UTC-6 (CST)
  - Summer (DST): UTC-5 (CDT)
- ZIP codes: 61051, 61064
- FIPS code: 17-141-21501

Eagle Point Township is one of twenty-four townships in Ogle County, Illinois, USA. As of the 2010 census, its population was 227 and it contained 106 housing units.

== History ==
Eagle Point Township was formed in September 1869 from a portion of Buffalo Township.

== Geography ==
According to the 2010 census, the township has a total area of 19.57 square miles (50.7 km^{2}), all land. It is a fractional township, smaller than a normal township of 36 square miles.

=== Cemeteries ===
The township contains these four cemeteries: Eagle Point, Elkhorn, Nichols and Webster.

== Demographics ==
Historical population
Census	Pop.	Note	%±
2016 (est.)	218
U.S. Decennial Census

== School districts ==
- Polo Community Unit School District 222

== Political districts ==
- Illinois's 16th congressional district
- State House District 90
- State Senate District 45
