= Dryhead Country =

Region in Montana, US

Coordinates: 45°14′0″N 108°13′0″W

Dryhead Country is a region in Carbon County and Big Horn County in southern Montana between Bighorn Canyon and the Pryor Mountains. The locale was named after the piles of dry bison skulls that accumulated at the base of a local buffalo jump. The Dryhead region starts near the Wyoming border in Bighorn Canyon National Recreation Area and extends northward into the Crow Indian Reservation. Dryhead Creek drains a portion of the area, falling eastwards into Bighorn Canyon. The semi-arid basin is one of the most remote areas in Montana. The area is sparsely populated with isolated ranches.

Limited settlement took place in the late 19th century in the form of small homesteads that took advantage of the open range to become ranching operations. Several of these ranches have been preserved within Bighorn Canyon National Recreation Area. The Ewing-Snell Ranch was established in 1898, and acquired a post office until 1906, known as Ewing, Montana. From 1915 the Cedarvale Dude Ranch received mail as "Hillsboro, Montana," operating until 1945. Another post office operated on Dryhead Creek as "Dryhead, Montana" from 1919 to 1924, before moving to the Kearns ranch, then to the Smith ranch. It was closed in 1946.
