= Cammock's Hotel =

- U.S. National Register of Historic Places
- Location within Montana
- Location: 28 N. Main St., Lodge Grass, Montana
- Coordinates: 45°18′57″N 107°21′49″W
- Area: less than one acre
- Built: 1920
- Built by: Cammocks, Edward
- MPS: Lodge Grass MRA
- NRHP reference No.: 87001271
- Added to NRHP: August 30, 1987

Cammock's Hotel, at 28 N. Main St. in Lodge Grass, Montana, dates from 1920. Also known as the Old REA Building, it was listed on the National Register of Historic Places in 1987.

It is a two-story brick building which was built by Edward Cammocks in 1920. It later served the Rural Electric Association.
