= Bighorn Lake =

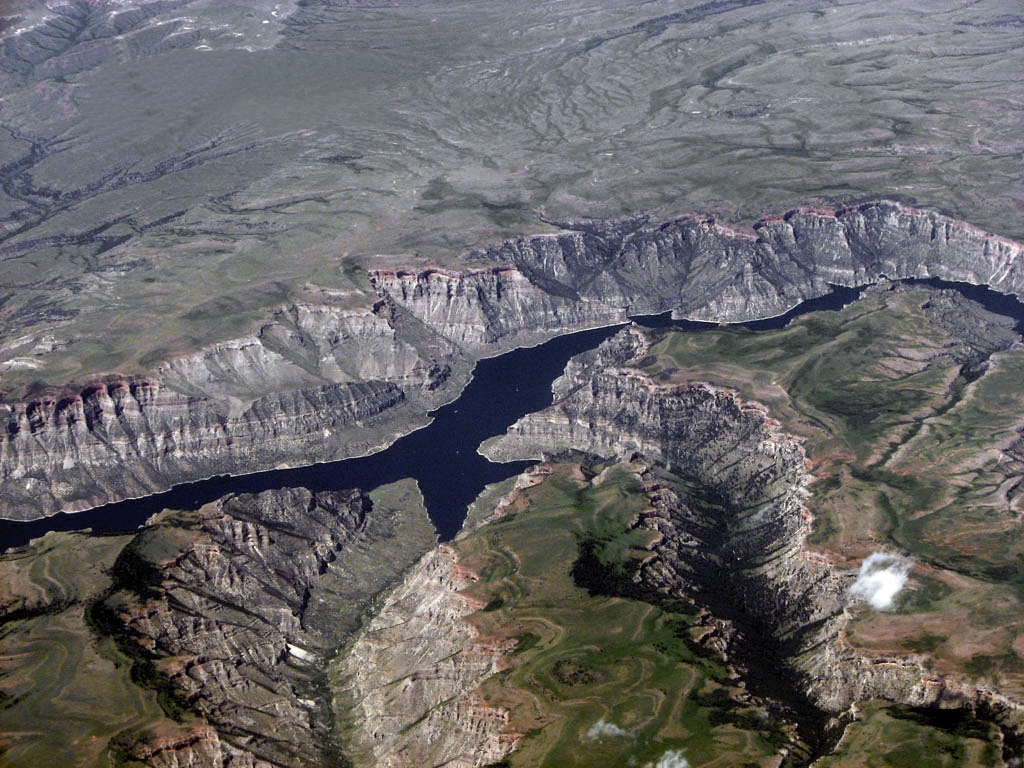
- Southwestern part

- Location within Montana Location within the United States
- Location: Big Horn / Carbon counties in Montana; and Big Horn County in Wyoming
- Coordinates: 45°18′28″N 107°57′27″W
- Type: reservoir
- Primary inflows: Bighorn River
- Primary outflows: Bighorn River
- Catchment area: 20,000 square miles (50,000 km2)
- Basin countries: United States

Bighorn Lake is a reservoir behind Yellowtail Dam within the Bighorn Canyon National Recreation Area, located in northern Wyoming and extending into southern Montana.

== Geography ==
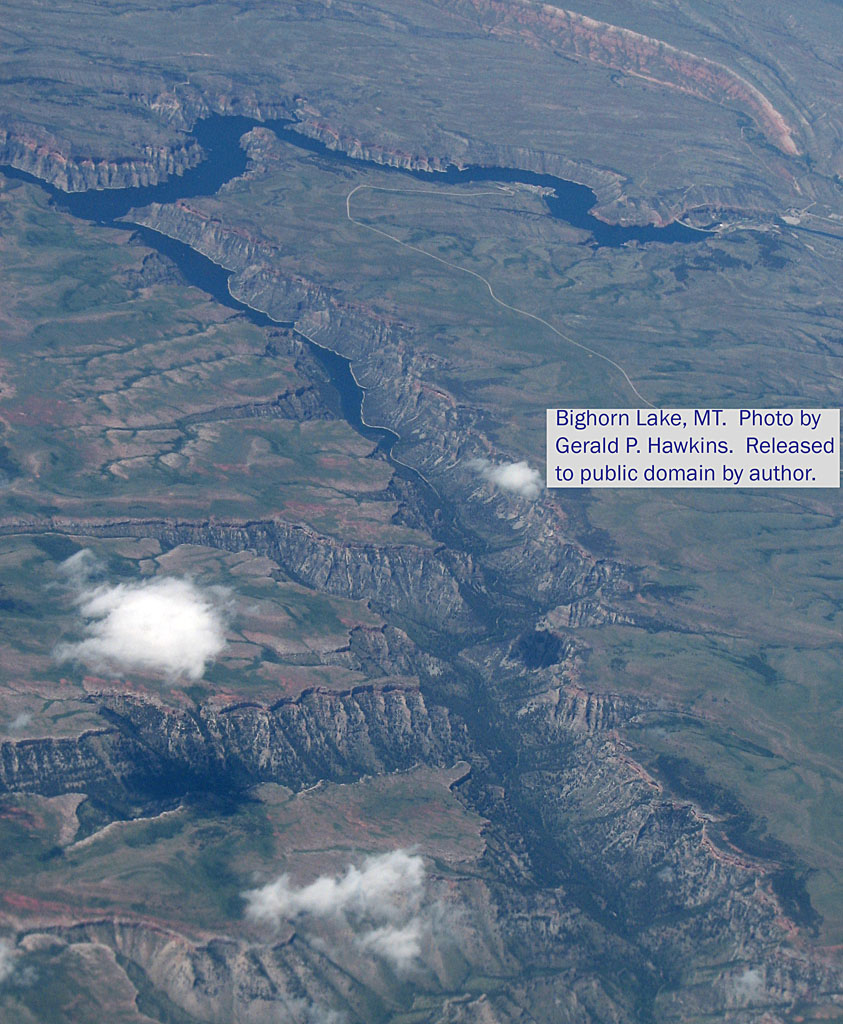
Eastern section of Bighorn Lake reservoir in Bighorn Canyon

The reservoir is 40 mi (64 km) south of Billings, Montana. It stretches the entire 72 mi (115 km) length of the Bighorn Canyon at full pool. The Lake was created by the 1965 construction of Yellowtail Dam on the Bighorn River, near Fort Smith, Montana.

== Fishing ==
Bighorn Lake has a surface area of 5574 acres, because of the dam, streamflow in the river is relatively stable with little daily fluctuation. Bighorn Lake supports a warmwater fishery.

Fish species within the lake
Species	Family	Class	Native to MT
Black bullhead	Catfish	Warmwater	Introduced
Black crappie	Sunfish	Warmwater	Introduced
Brook trout	Trout	Coldwater	Introduced
Brown trout	Trout	Coldwater	Introduced
Burbot	Codfish	Coldwater	Native
Channel catfish	Catfish	Warmwater	Native
Common carp	Minnow	Warmwater	Introduced
Emerald shiner	Minnow	Warmwater	Native
Fathead minnow	Minnow	Warmwater	Native
Flathead chub	Minnow	Warmwater	Native
Green sunfish	Sunfish	Warmwater	Introduced
Largemouth bass	Sunfish	Warmwater	Introduced
Longnose dace	Minnow	Warmwater	Native
Longnose sucker	Sucker	Warmwater	Native
Mountain whitefish	Trout	Coldwater	Native
Plains minnow	Minnow	Warmwater	Native
Pumpkinseed	Sunfish	Warmwater	Introduced
Rainbow trout	Trout	Coldwater	Introduced
River carpsucker	Sucker	Warmwater	Native
Sauger	Perch	Warmwater	Native
Shorthead redhorse	Sucker	Warmwater	Native
Shovelnose sturgeon	Sturgeon	Warmwater	Native
Smallmouth bass	Sunfish	Warmwater	Introduced
Spottail shiner	Minnow	Warmwater	Introduced
Noturus flavus	Catfish		Native
Walleye	Perch	Warmwater	Introduced
Western silvery minnow	Minnow	Warmwater	Native
White crappie	Sunfish	Warmwater	Introduced
White sucker	Sucker	Warmwater	Native
Yellow perch	Perch	Warmwater	Introduced

== See also ==
- Bighorn Canyon National Recreation Area topics
