= John Ryan's House =

Historic house in Montana, United States

- U.S. National Register of Historic Places
- Location within Montana
- Location: 15 N. Helen St., Lodge Grass, Montana
- Coordinates: 45°18′51″N 107°21′50″W
- Area: less than one acre
- Built: 1920
- Architect: Ryan, John T.
- Architectural style: Bungalow/craftsman
- MPS: Lodge Grass MRA
- NRHP reference No.: 87001277
- Added to NRHP: August 3, 1987

John Ryan's House, at 15 N. Helen St. in Lodge Grass, Montana, was built in 1920. It was listed on the National Register of Historic Places in 1987.

It is a one-story bungalow style house, home of a barber who became the first mayor of Lodge Grass.
