= Downtown Commercial District (Bowling Green, Kentucky) =

Historic district in Kentucky, United States

== History ==
=== The Civil War in Downtown Bowling Green ===
The Civil War is an integral part of the history of Bowling Green and its downtown commercial district. Due to Bowling Green's strategic location along the Barren River, and its regional economic and industrial power, it was a coveted city by both the Confederates and the Union. Kentucky was a hotly contested state due to its pro-slavery policies, but refusal to secede. Furthermore, its location right on the border between the Confederacy and the Union made it an instant war zone. Early in the war, a large Confederate force marched into downtown Bowling Green and began fortifying the city. Eventually, over 20,000 Confederate soldiers arrived at the downtown train depot and garrisoned the city. The soldiers fortified hills on the edge of downtown, and spent a great deal of time ensuring the city would not fall to Union invaders. Soldiers even converted Hobson Grove, a mansion at the edge of downtown, into a fort with a large storage of ammunition, weapons, and munitions for troops. The occupying Confederate forces, so confident in the town's defenses, dubbed it "The Gibraltar of the West". Businesses, such as taverns, restaurants, and even brothels catered to the occupying forces, who spent their wages on food, drink, and comfort in these downtown establishments. Downtown Bowling Green was eventually made into the Confederate Capitol of Kentucky, despite the local populations pro-Union preference, and a Confederate government was established and operated out of the downtown district. Unfortunately for the rebels, Union victories at Mill Springs and Columbus forced the Confederates to retreat from the town, as they would have been surrounded if they had stayed. The Confederates destroyed much of downtown's infrastructure as they left, dealing a great blow to the local economy in the process. Union troops entered the town after the Confederates left in 1862, and they remained there for the rest of the war. The Civil War, though it destroyed much of the downtown's infrastructure and economy, eventually paved the way for the town to rebuild, and gave the town a metaphorical "blank slate" to start anew.

=== The Post-War Decades ===
After the aforementioned destruction of industry, such as the railroad tracks, buildings of potential military relevance, and munitions storages, downtown Bowling Green needed to rebuild. Residents came together, and in conjunction with the industrial revolution that swept the United States, quickly rebuilt and expanded upon the economy and infrastructure of downtown. Around this time, a new train depot was built, the railroads were repaired, and new businesses sprung up after the expansion of the Louisville-Nashville railroad during the war years. Furthermore, more railroad routes that passed through Bowling Green were added to the existing Louisville-Nashville routes, which increased Bowling Green's reputation as a railroad hub. Now that civilians were riding the railroads again, they needed places to stop and rest. Bowling Green was the perfect place for this to occur, and inns and places of recreation for travelers passing by sprung up all over downtown Bowling Green. Furthermore, the economic expansion of Bowling Green was even more exaggerated with the arrival of more and more Americans traveling West from East coast cities. Between the end of the war and the turn of the century, downtown Bowling Green experienced an economic boom that powered it in to being the third largest city in Kentucky, and the unquestioned regional capitol of South-central Kentucky. Many of the buildings constructed during this time period remain in downtown today, and are still important to the local business market and economy.

=== Western Kentucky University ===
Western Kentucky University is a central part of downtown Bowling Green's continued success and growth in the 20th and 21st centuries. Formerly known as the Southern Normal School, Western Kentucky University was donated to the state and renamed to its current moniker in 1906 by its president, Henry Hardin Cherry. Western Kentucky University is now one of the largest universities in Kentucky, behind only the University of Louisville and the University of Kentucky in size. As the size of the university grew rapidly during the 20th century, it attracted more and more visitors and new residents to downtown Bowling Green. Located just blocks from the center of downtown, many restaurants, shops, and bars opened to cater to the needs of the thousands of college students that filled the streets of downtown every fall and spring. In more recent years, Western Kentucky University has even began to create classroom spaces in the middle of downtown. The business school recently opened a 5,000 square foot classroom space right next to Fountain Square, the central part of downtown. The impact of Western Kentucky University on the local economy cannot be understated. Alongside the businesses that have opened to cater to college students, downtown banks and other financial institutions have benefitted from the influx of college students seeking the services needed to navigate college life. Today, downtown and campus are nearly adjacent, with more and more integration occurring each and every year.

== Present-Day Downtown ==
=== Historic Buildings ===
- Downtown Commercial District
- U.S. National Register of Historic Places
- U.S. Historic district
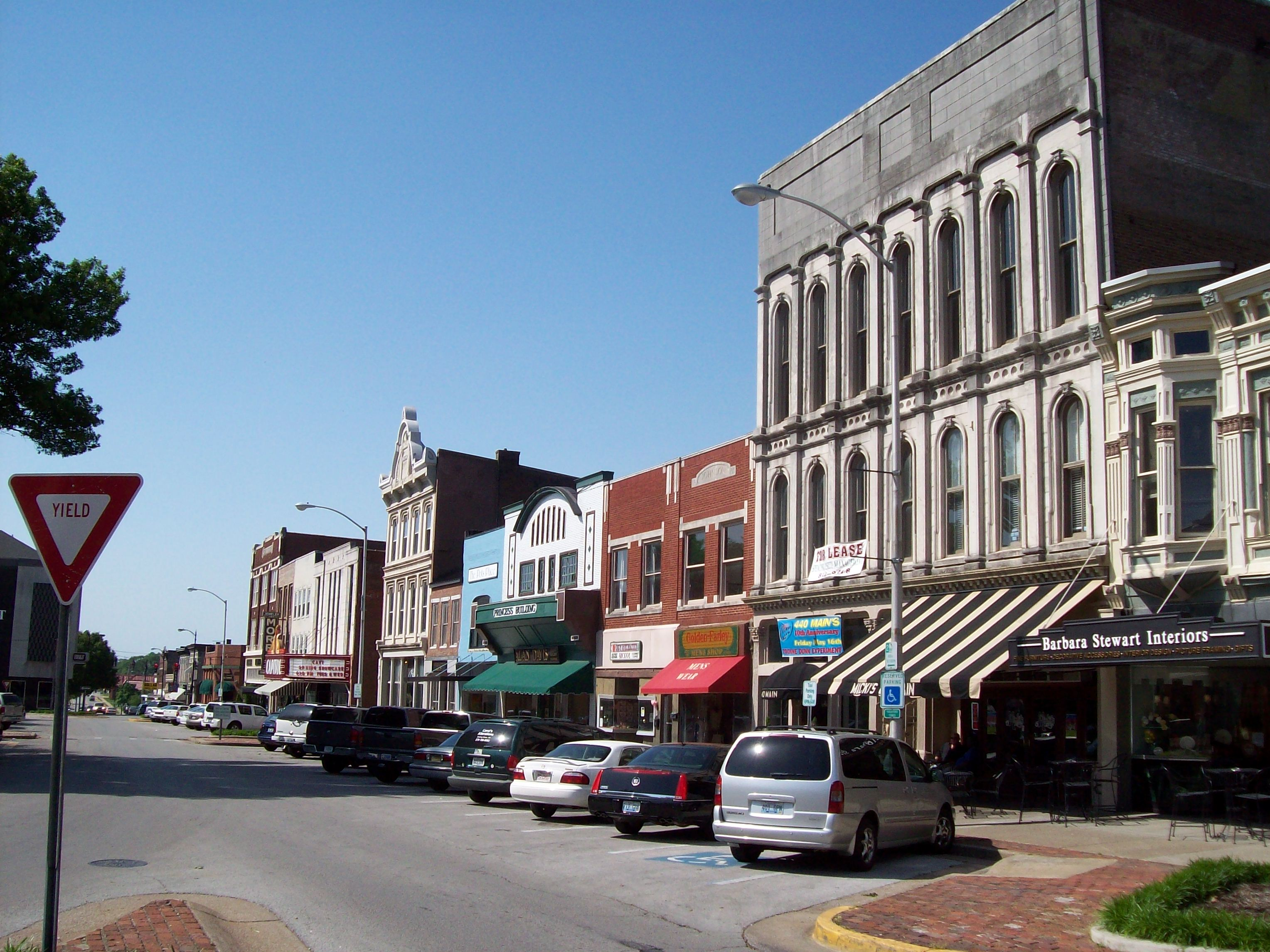
- Shops along Fountain Square

- Location within Kentucky Location within the United States
- Location: Roughly bounded by Adams and State Sts., 8th and 10th Aves., Bowling Green, Kentucky
- Coordinates: 36°59′37″N 86°26′31″W
- Area: 24 acres (9.7 ha)
- Built: 1840
- Architectural style: Mixed (more Than 2 Styles From Different Periods)
- MPS: Warren County MRA
- NRHP reference No.: 79003510
- Added to NRHP: December 18, 1979

The Downtown Commercial District in Bowling Green, Kentucky is a historic district that was listed on the National Register of Historic Places in 1979. In 1979, it included 113 buildings deemed to contribute to the historic character of the area.

A few of the district's buildings are:

- Combs Building (from last 25 years of 1800s), 908 State Street, a 2 1/2-story brick commercial building
- Greer Building (from last 25 years of 1800s), 910 and 912 State Street, two-story six-bay building with metal cornice
- Garvin Building (from last 25 years of 1800s), 918 State Street, a three-story Italianate building with original metal cornice
- T. C. Mitchell Building (1903), 926-928 State Street, 2 1/2-story seven-bay brick building with molded brick cornice

The district was listed as part of a review of historic resources in Warren County.

=== Notable Buildings ===
Some of the more important buildings in downtown Bowling Green, both economically and aesthetically, include (but are not limited to):

- The Chase Bank Building (from 1952), 500 East Main Street, regional financial center for US Bank and important contributor to downtown economy.
- The Bowling Green Towers (from 1967), 1149 College Street, tallest buildings in downtown and offer affordable living for hundreds of downtown residents.
- The Warren County Justice Center, 1001 Center Street, center for county government operations and the Warren County Courthouse.
- Bowling Green Ballpark (from 2009), 300 East 8th avenue, home of Bowling Green's only professional sports team, the Bowling Green Hot Rods (baseball). Important tourist attraction and source of revenue for downtown.
