= James J. Sullivan House =

- U.S. National Register of Historic Places
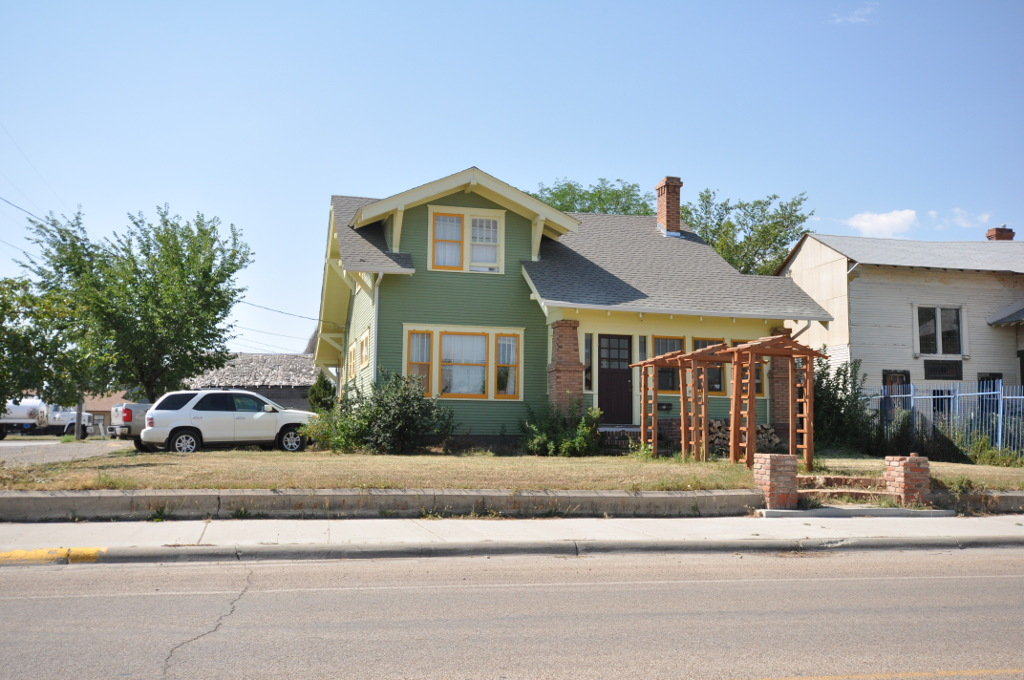

- Location within Montana
- Location: 220 W. Third St., Hardin, Montana
- Coordinates: 45°43′52″N 107°36′32″W
- Area: less than one acre
- Built: 1914
- Built by: Bruer & Stanton
- Architectural style: Bungalow/craftsman
- MPS: Hardin MPS
- NRHP reference No.: 91000380
- Added to NRHP: April 11, 1991

The James J. Sullivan House, at 220 W. Third St. in Hardin, Montana, was built in 1914. It was listed on the National Register of Historic Places in 1991.

Also known as Jacobson House, it is a one-and-a-half-story house which was deemed to be "an excellent example of Craftsman style architecture in Hardin."

A second contributing building on the property is an open shed/garage, whose back wall is shared with the Burla barn on adjoining property.
