= John Boyum House =

- U.S. National Register of Historic Places
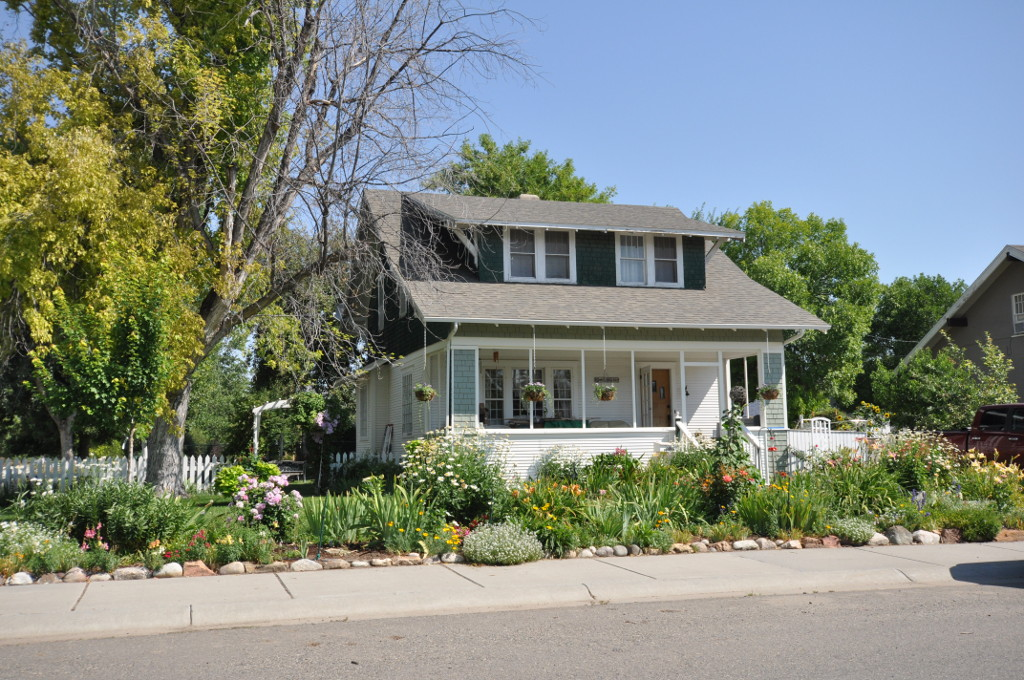

- Location within Montana
- Location: 225 W. Sixth St., Hardin, Montana
- Coordinates: 45°44′05″N 107°36′35″W
- Area: less than one acre
- Built: 1917
- Built by: Wilbur S. Fish
- Architectural style: Bungalow/craftsman
- MPS: Hardin MPS
- NRHP reference No.: 91000371
- Added to NRHP: April 11, 1991

The John Boyum House, at 225 W. Sixth St. in Hardin, Montana, was built in 1917. It was listed on the National Register of Historic Places in 1991. The listing included two contributing buildings.

It is an American craftsman bungalow in style, and was probably built by local contractor Wilbur S. Fish.
