= Camp Four (Fort Smith, Montana) =

- U.S. National Register of Historic Places
- Location within Montana Location within the United States
- Nearest city: Fort Smith, Montana
- Coordinates: 45°24′50″N 107°53′43″W
- Built: 1920
- NRHP reference No.: 91001940
- Added to NRHP: January 21, 1992

Camp Four on Campbell Farm, about 12 miles (19 km) from Fort Smith, Montana, is nationally significant for its association with Thomas D. Campbell, "once the world's largest wheat farmer", and "a pioneer in industrialized corporate farming methods." It is the best preserved of two permanent camps, which along with six temporary camps, served the wheat farm during the period from 1918 to the 1960s.

It was listed on the National Register of Historic Places in 1992. It has 12 buildings and three other structures, including five bunkhouses, two commissaries, a workshop, a water tank, a "cowboy house" and an "oil house."

== See also ==
- Thomas D. Campbell House, in Grand Forks, North Dakota, log cabin and wood-frame house that was Thomas Campbell's childhood home, also NRHP-listed
