= Commercial District (Hardin, Montana) =

Historic district in Montana, United States

- U.S. National Register of Historic Places
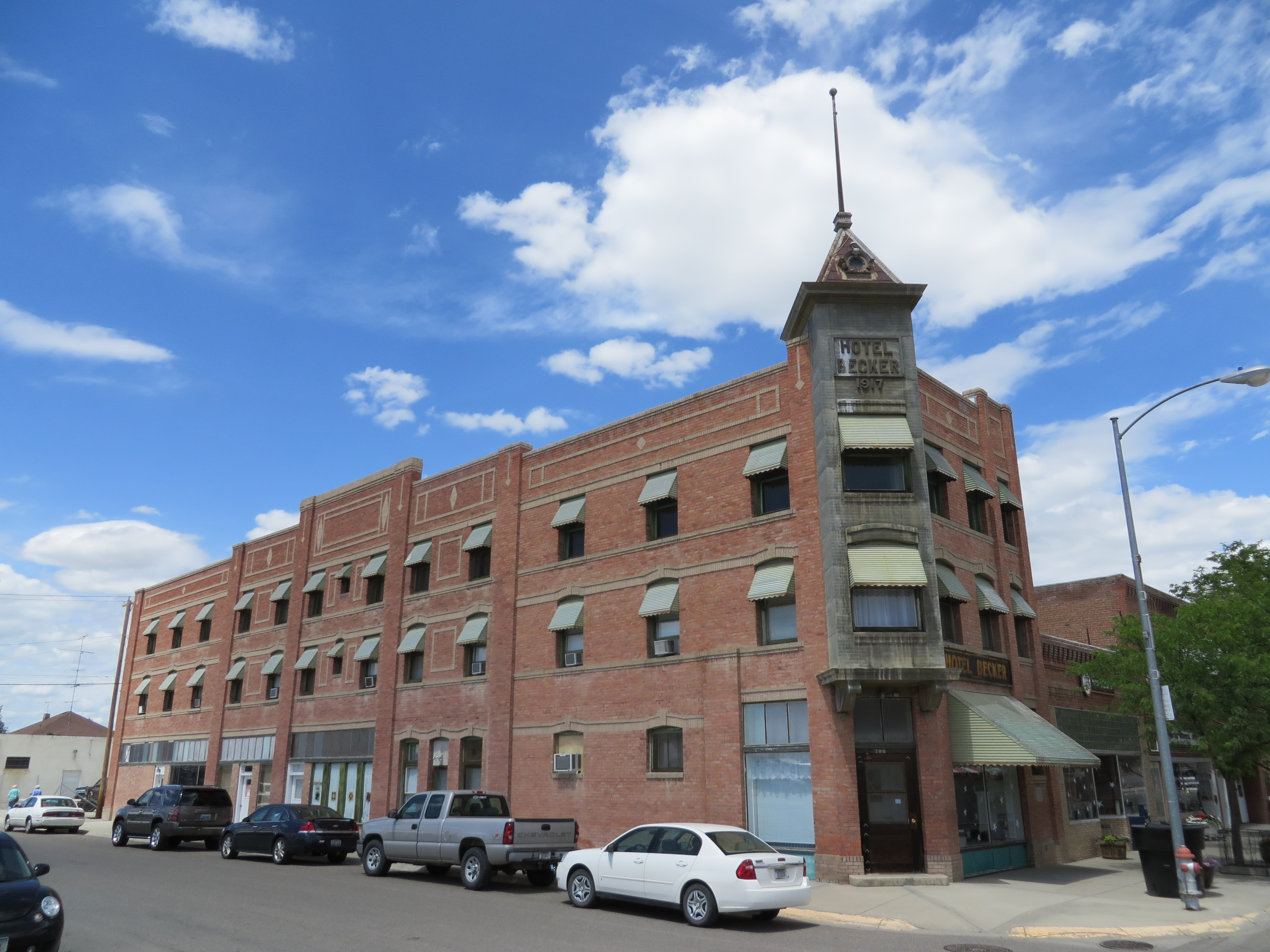

- Location within Montana
- Location: Roughly bounded by 4th, Crook, the Burlington Northern line, 1st and Crow Sts., Hardin, Montana
- Coordinates: 45°43′46″N 107°36′30″W
- Area: 47 acres (19 ha)
- Built by: Multiple
- Architectural style: Classical Revival
- MPS: Hardin MRA
- NRHP reference No.: 85001845
- Added to NRHP: August 14, 1985

The Commercial District in Hardin, Montana is a 47 acres (19 ha) area roughly bounded by 4th, Crook, the Burlington Northern line, 1st and Crow Sts. It was listed on the National Register of Historic Places in 1985. It included 40 contributing buildings and two contributing structures.
