= Camphora, California =

Unincorporated community in California, United States

Camphora
- Unincorporated community
- Location in California
- Coordinates: 36°27′11″N 121°22′16″W
- Country: United States
- State: California
- County: Monterey
- Elevation: 171 ft (52 m)

Camphora (formerly Camp Four) is an unincorporated community in Monterey County, California, United States. It is located on U.S. Route 101 and the Southern Pacific Railroad line, 3 miles (4.8 km) northwest of Soledad, at an elevation of 171 feet (52 m).

Camphora began in 1873 as a railroad construction camp called Camp Four. Mexican workers pronounced the place as "camphora" and the railroad used this as the official name of the town.
