= Fort Smith, Montana =

Fort Smith, Montana Annu'ucheepe
- Census-designated place
- Location of Fort Smith, Montana
- Coordinates: 45°18′48″N 107°55′47″W
- Country: United States
- State: Montana
- County: Big Horn

Area
  - Total: 1.61 sq mi (4.17 km^{2})
  - Land: 1.38 sq mi (3.57 km^{2})
  - Water: 0.23 sq mi (0.59 km^{2})
- Elevation: 3,189 ft (972 m)

Population (2020)
  - Total: 170
  - Density: 123.2/sq mi (47.56/km^{2})
- Time zone: UTC-7 (Mountain (MST))
  - Summer (DST): UTC-6 (MDT)
- ZIP code: 59035
- Area code: 406
- FIPS code: 30-28650
- GNIS feature ID: 2408244

Fort Smith is a census-designated place (CDP) in Big Horn County, Montana, United States. It is on the Crow Indian Reservation. The population was 170 at the 2020 census. It was 161 at the 2010 census.

The Crow name for the town is Annu'ucheepe, “Mouth of the canyon.” The town took its name from former Fort C.F. Smith. The fort was established along the Bozeman Trail in 1866 but destroyed by Sioux warriors in 1868.

Camp Four is located about 11 miles (18 km) northeast of town. The camp is on the National Register of Historic Places due to its use on a large wheat farm from 1918 to the 1960s.

== Geography ==
According to the United States Census Bureau, the CDP has a total area of 1.7 square miles (4.3 km^{2}), of which 1.4 square miles (3.7 km^{2}) is land and 0.23 square miles (0.6 km^{2}), or 14.90%, is water. It is located along the Bighorn River where it exits from Bighorn Canyon. The North District of Bighorn Canyon National Recreation Area is accessed from town. Montana Highway 313 ends at Fort Smith and leads northeast 42 miles (68 km) to Hardin and Interstate 90.

According to the Köppen Climate Classification system, Fort Smith has a warm-summer humid continental climate, abbreviated "Dfb" on climate maps.

Climate data for Yellowtail Dam, Montana, 1991–2020 normals, extremes 1948–present
Month	Jan	Feb	Mar	Apr	May	Jun	Jul	Aug	Sep	Oct	Nov	Dec	Year
Record high °F (°C)	71 (22)	72 (22)	82 (28)	89 (32)	98 (37)	107 (42)	110 (43)	107 (42)	104 (40)	94 (34)	78 (26)	72 (22)	110 (43)
Mean maximum °F (°C)	59.7 (15.4)	62.1 (16.7)	72.1 (22.3)	81.2 (27.3)	87.5 (30.8)	96.4 (35.8)	102.1 (38.9)	100.5 (38.1)	95.2 (35.1)	83.1 (28.4)	68.9 (20.5)	61.0 (16.1)	103.2 (39.6)
Mean daily maximum °F (°C)	38.5 (3.6)	40.0 (4.4)	50.3 (10.2)	57.9 (14.4)	67.9 (19.9)	78.4 (25.8)	88.8 (31.6)	87.4 (30.8)	76.1 (24.5)	60.5 (15.8)	47.5 (8.6)	39.4 (4.1)	61.1 (16.1)
Daily mean °F (°C)	29.0 (−1.7)	30.5 (−0.8)	39.1 (3.9)	46.8 (8.2)	55.9 (13.3)	65.6 (18.7)	74.0 (23.3)	72.3 (22.4)	62.3 (16.8)	49.3 (9.6)	37.8 (3.2)	30.3 (−0.9)	49.4 (9.7)
Mean daily minimum °F (°C)	19.6 (−6.9)	21.0 (−6.1)	27.9 (−2.3)	35.6 (2.0)	44.0 (6.7)	52.7 (11.5)	59.2 (15.1)	57.3 (14.1)	48.6 (9.2)	38.0 (3.3)	28.2 (−2.1)	21.3 (−5.9)	37.8 (3.2)
Mean minimum °F (°C)	−6.0 (−21.1)	−0.4 (−18.0)	6.4 (−14.2)	21.1 (−6.1)	31.5 (−0.3)	41.0 (5.0)	49.7 (9.8)	45.6 (7.6)	34.7 (1.5)	20.0 (−6.7)	5.8 (−14.6)	−2.8 (−19.3)	−14.2 (−25.7)
Record low °F (°C)	−30 (−34)	−32 (−36)	−20 (−29)	4 (−16)	21 (−6)	31 (−1)	32 (0)	35 (2)	20 (−7)	−11 (−24)	−14 (−26)	−28 (−33)	−32 (−36)
Average precipitation inches (mm)	0.72 (18)	0.83 (21)	1.21 (31)	1.95 (50)	2.62 (67)	2.27 (58)	1.15 (29)	0.78 (20)	1.67 (42)	1.98 (50)	0.77 (20)	0.72 (18)	16.67 (424)
Average snowfall inches (cm)	8.8 (22)	7.4 (19)	8.4 (21)	3.0 (7.6)	0.2 (0.51)	0.0 (0.0)	0.0 (0.0)	0.0 (0.0)	0.0 (0.0)	3.0 (7.6)	5.8 (15)	7.3 (19)	43.9 (111.71)
Average precipitation days (≥ 0.01 in)	4.9	4.5	6.0	7.6	8.0	7.4	5.0	3.7	4.7	6.0	4.1	4.5	66.4
Average snowy days (≥ 0.1 in)	2.3	2.2	1.4	0.8	0.1	0.0	0.0	0.0	0.0	0.7	1.2	2.4	11.1
Source 1: NOAA
Source 2: National Weather Service

== Demographics ==
Historical population
Census	Pop.	Note	%±
2020	170		—
U.S. Decennial Census

As of the census of 2000, there were 122 people, 51 households, and 31 families residing in the CDP. The population density was 103.6 inhabitants per square mile (40.0/km^{2}). There were 143 housing units at an average density of 121.4 per square mile (46.9/km^{2}). The racial makeup of the CDP was 64.75% White, 32.79% Native American, 2.46% from other races. Hispanic or Latino of any race were 4.92% of the population.

There were 51 households, out of which 39.2% had children under the age of 18 living with them, 49.0% were married couples living together, 5.9% had a female householder with no husband present, and 39.2% were non-families. 37.3% of all households were made up of individuals, and 3.9% had someone living alone who was 65 years of age or older. The average household size was 2.39 and the average family size was 3.26.

In the CDP, the population was spread out, with 34.4% under the age of 18, 3.3% from 18 to 24, 34.4% from 25 to 44, 20.5% from 45 to 64, and 7.4% who were 65 years of age or older. The median age was 34 years. For every 100 females, there were 159.6 males. For every 100 females age 18 and over, there were 158.1 males.

The median income for a household in the CDP was $24,250, and the median income for a family was $24,333. Males had a median income of $16,250 versus $12,045 for females. The per capita income for the CDP was $10,692. There were 68.2% of families and 50.0% of the population living below the poverty line, including 55.1% of under eighteens and none of those over 64.

== Education ==
Fort Smith had an elementary school until it closed in May 2025. The Hardin School District provides education for all grades.
