= Yellowtail Dam =

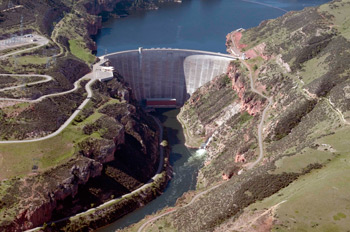
- View of the dam face looking upstream

- Location of the Yellowtail Dam in Montana
- Country: United States
- Location: Big Horn County, Montana
- Coordinates: 45°18′24″N 107°57′29″W
- Construction began: 1961
- Opening date: 1967
- Construction cost: $110 million
- Owner: U.S. Bureau of Reclamation

Dam and spillways
- Type of dam: Concrete arch-gravity
- Impounds: Bighorn River
- Height: 525 ft (160 m)
- Length: 1,480 ft (450 m)
- Width (crest): 22 ft (6.7 m)
- Width (base): 147 ft (45 m)
- Dam volume: 1,545,664 yd^{3} (1,181,745 m^{3})
- Spillways: 1 main + outlet works
- Spillway type: Concrete tunnel, 2x radial gates
- Spillway capacity: 92,000 cu ft/s (2,600 m^{3}/s)

Reservoir
- Creates: Bighorn Lake
- Total capacity: 1,381,189 acre⋅ft (1.703672 km^{3})
- Catchment area: 19,600 sq mi (51,000 km^{2})
- Surface area: 17,300 acres (7,000 ha)

Power Station
- Hydraulic head: 495 ft (151 m)
- Turbines: 4x 62.5MW Francis
- Installed capacity: 250 MW
- Annual generation: 510,564,280 kWh

Yellowtail Dam is a dam across the Bighorn River in south central Montana in the United States. The mid-1960s era concrete arch dam serves to regulate the flow of the Bighorn for irrigation purposes and to generate hydroelectric power. The dam and its reservoir, Bighorn Lake, are owned by the U.S. Bureau of Reclamation.

The project was the result of negotiations between the federal government and the Crow Tribe, the tribe of Native Americans that lived on the surrounding Crow Indian Reservation, and was originally envisioned as a shared facility that would provide profits for both sides. There were deep divisions within the Crow Tribe on support and opposition for the dam construction itself as well as on leasing or sale of the land to the government.

Eventually, the land was sold to Reclamation, although much of the reservoir, which extends 72 miles (116 km) upstream into Wyoming, lies in the reservation. The dam was authorized in 1944 and groundbreaking was in 1961; it was completed in 1967 after six years of construction. Today aside from its original purposes the dam serves for recreation both above and below the structure. Regulation of the Bighorn provided by the Yellowtail Dam has transformed the lower river into one of Montana's premier trout streams. However, there has been significant controversy surrounding the allocation of water in the reservoir between Montana and Wyoming, and the ecological damage wrought on 184 miles (296 km) of river both above and below the dam.

== History ==
=== Planning ===
In the early 20th century, the population of the Yellowstone River valley of southern Montana, of which the Bighorn River is the largest tributary, was growing rapidly and so was the acreage of irrigated land – however, the system was vulnerable to floods and droughts. In 1905, the federal government conducted the first feasibility studies for a dam on a stretch of the Bighorn within the Crow Indian Reservation, some 45 miles (72 km) southeast of Billings, Montana. The leaders of the Crow Tribe, which owned the land, agreed to building a dam there because electricity generated there would provide income for the tribe.

Construction of the Yellowtail Dam was authorized by the Flood Control Act on December 22, 1944 as part of the Pick-Sloan Plan, a water management scheme covering the entire upper Missouri River Basin in the north-central United States. Three proposals were then made by the Reclamation Service, the predecessor of the present-day Bureau of Reclamation, during the first half of the century. The first idea called for the building of a 480-foot (150 m) arch gravity dam at the present-day site. The second suggested constructing a pair of smaller dams on the river about 70 miles (110 km) apart. Plans for the current dam were finalized in the 1950s, as a high dam would provide a greater hydraulic head, allowing water to be diverted into canals at higher elevations to serve farms both within and downstream of the Crow lands.

The dam is named after Robert Yellowtail, chairman of the tribe during the 1940s. Yellowtail was one of the main opponents of the dam and also protested when the tribe decided to sell the dam site to the federal government. For a while, the Crow Tribe considered leasing the land to the government for fifty years at a rate of $1,000,000 per year. The arguments deeply divided the tribe, causing them to separate into two factions, the Mountain Crows, which backed Yellowtail and opposed the dam, and the River Crows, which supported the dam. Eventually, the land was sold for $2.5 million, and controversy continued for years afterward.

=== Construction ===
Boise, Idaho based Morrison-Knudsen, at the time the largest heavy contractor in the world, landed the contract to build the dam. Morrison-Knudsen had previously built the Hoover and Grand Coulee Dams. Official groundbreaking for the Yellowtail Dam was in 1961 and the construction of a diversion tunnel was begun soon afterwards. The concrete-lined conduit ultimately extended over 2,000 feet (610 m) and had a diameter of 32 feet (9.8 m). A cofferdam was then raised to divert the Bighorn out of the dam site into the tunnel. The first concrete pour was on March 16, 1963, and the diversion tunnel was closed in November 1965, allowing the river to begin filling Bighorn Lake. In the same year, the Yellowtail Afterbay Dam, serving to regulate releases from the main dam, was completed 2.2 miles (3.5 km) downstream of Yellowtail Dam. The Yellowtail Dam was topped out in December 1967 after six years of work. Surprisingly, for such a huge structure, only one death occurred during the entire construction process.

== Characteristics ==
=== Dam and reservoir ===
The Yellowtail Dam is a concrete thin-arch dam 525 feet (160 m) high and 1,480 feet (450 m) long, containing 1,545,664 cubic yards (1,181,745 m^{3}) of material. The crest of the dam lies 3,660 feet (1,120 m) above sea level. As the crow flies, the dam is 45 miles (72 km) southeast of Billings and 23 miles (37 km) north of the Montana-Wyoming border. The dam and reservoir lie in Bighorn Canyon in the northwestern portion of the Bighorn Range where the Bighorn River cuts through it, 112 miles (180 km) above the Bighorn's junction with the Yellowstone at Custer, Montana.

Bighorn Lake is the reservoir formed behind the dam, and has a capacity of 1,381,189 acre-feet (1.703672×10^{9} m^{3}) of water. At normal storage the reservoir covers 17,300 acres (70 km^{2}), extending over 70 miles (110 km) upstream. The lake is long and narrow, except for the uppermost section near Kane, Wyoming where it broadens to about 2 miles (3.2 km). Aside from the Bighorn River the reservoir is also fed by the Shoshone River, Porcupine Creek, Dry Head Creek, Big Bull Elk Creek, Black Canyon Creek, and smaller tributaries.

=== Power generation ===
The dam's hydroelectric plant is located at the base and has a capacity of 250 MW. The plant has four Francis turbines rated at 87,500 horsepower, each capable of driving a 62,500 KW generator. The hydraulic head is roughly 495 feet (151 m) at normal reservoir elevation. Operations of the facility began in 1966, one year before the completion of the dam. The power station is used based on peaking power demand and thus releases can vary drastically over the course of a day. The Yellowtail Afterbay dam, built for the purpose of regulating the fluctuating discharge from the power station, lies 2.2 miles (3.5 km) below the main dam and can store 3,140 acre-feet (3,870,000 m^{3}) of water. This dam generally releases a constant flow of 2,500 to 3,000 cubic feet per second (71 to 85 m^{3}/s) into the Bighorn.

=== Spillway ===
To pass flood waters the Yellowtail Dam is equipped with a tunnel spillway on the left side, capable of handling 92,000 cubic feet per second (2,600 m^{3}/s). The spillway is controlled by a pair of radial gates measuring 25 feet (7.6 m) high and 64.4 feet (19.6 m) long. The dam also has a set of outlet works that can discharge up to 2,500 cubic feet per second (71 m^{3}/s).

In 1967, heavy snowmelt in the Bighorn River basin caused the reservoir to rise to record levels. Reclamation opened the spillway of the dam for twenty consecutive days in June and July of that year. However, the design of the spillway tunnel was flawed, causing severe cavitation of the concrete, leading to the formation of a hole the size of an eighteen-wheeler in the concrete lining. The resulting repairs and retrofits to the spillway were the vital predecessor to the repair work to dams such as Hoover, Glen Canyon and Flaming Gorge that would follow severe floods in 1983 in the Colorado River basin.

== Recreation ==
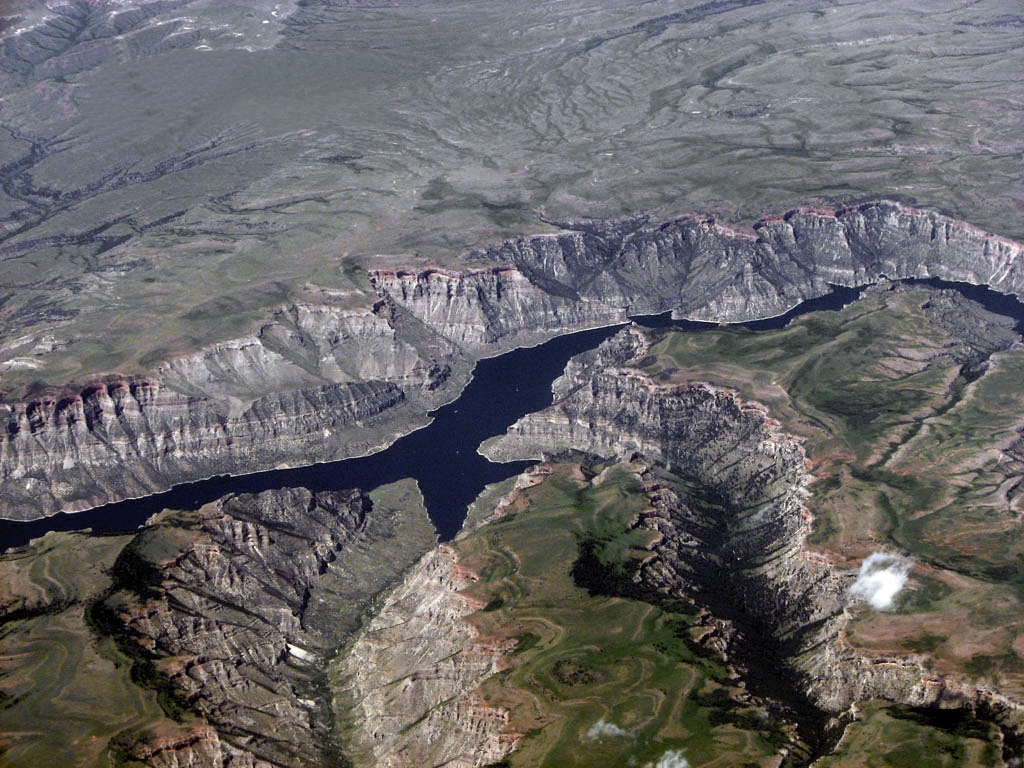
Bighorn Lake is the reservoir formed by Yellowtail Dam and is a popular boating area.

Although unplanned for, by regulating the flow of the Bighorn River and releasing cooler water from the bottom of Bighorn Lake, the Yellowtail Dam has created one of the finest wild trout fisheries in the United States in the slightly more than 110 miles (180 km) of river downstream. However, the dam has significantly changed the native riverine habitat downstream as well – cutting off the supply of sediments, which once created islands and sandbars in the Bighorn's winding lower course. Nevertheless, the combination of cold, fast-flowing water and abundant nutrients creates an ideal trout habitat; the average length of a trout caught in the lower Bighorn is 14 inches (36 cm), while the record was a 16-pound (7.3 kg) rainbow trout 29 inches (74 cm) long.

In recent years there has been controversy between Montana and Wyoming over whether more water should be kept in Bighorn Lake for boating and water-skiing uses (almost two-thirds of the surface area of Bighorn Lake is in Wyoming), or released from the dam to maintain the trout fishery downstream. Because of a long and ongoing drought in the western United States, Reclamation has reduced the amount of water below the Yellowtail Dam from 2,500 cubic feet per second (71 m^{3}/s) to 2,000 cubic feet per second (57 m^{3}/s). The lower flows have led to unhealthy trout populations in turn causing the fishing industry on the lower Bighorn to decline by over 40 percent. However, low water levels in the lake have caused recreational usage in Wyoming to drop more than 60%. In an attempt to reduce tensions between the two states Reclamation has agreed to keep the lake at a higher level while maintaining at least 1,500 cubic feet per second (42 m^{3}/s) of flow below the dam.

== See also ==
- Bighorn Basin
- Bighorn Canyon National Recreation Area topics
- List of reservoirs and dams in the United States

== Works cited ==
- Edmunds, R. David (2004). The New Warriors: Native American Leaders since 1900. University of Nebraska Press. ISBN 0-8032-6751-7.
- Fischer, Hank; Fischer, Carol (2008). Paddling Montana. Globe Pequot. ISBN 978-0-7627-4352-0.
- Holmes, Krys; Walter, Dave; Dailey, Susan C. (2008). Montana: Stories of the Land. Montana Historical Society. ISBN 978-0-9759196-3-7.
- Powell, James Lawrence (2008). Dead pool: Lake Powell, global warming, and the future of water in the west. University of California Press. ISBN 978-0-520-25477-0. "Dead pool: Lake Powell, global warming, and the future of water in the west."
