= Bighorn Canyon National Recreation Area =

National recreation area in the United States

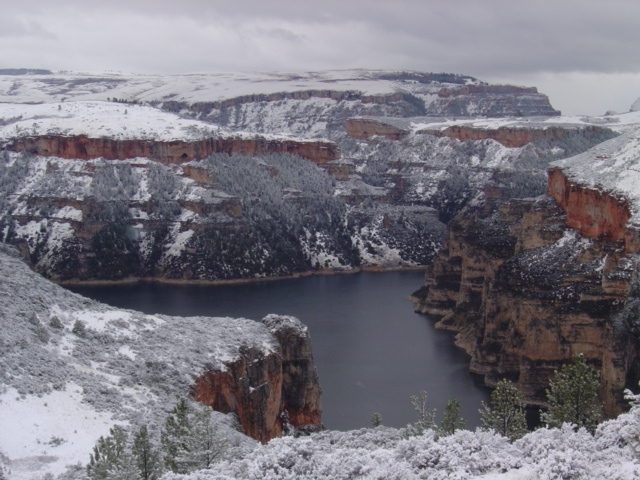
- Snowfall on the Bighorn Canyon in the North District

- Location within Montana Location within the United States
- Location: Big Horn and Carbon counties, Montana & Big Horn County, Wyoming, USA
- Nearest city: Billings, Montana
- Coordinates: 45°11′40″N 108°7′50″W
- Area: 120,296.22 acres (486.8215 km^{2})
- Established: October 15, 1966
- Visitors: 217,660 (in 2022)
- Governing body: National Park Service
- Website: Bighorn Canyon National Recreation Area

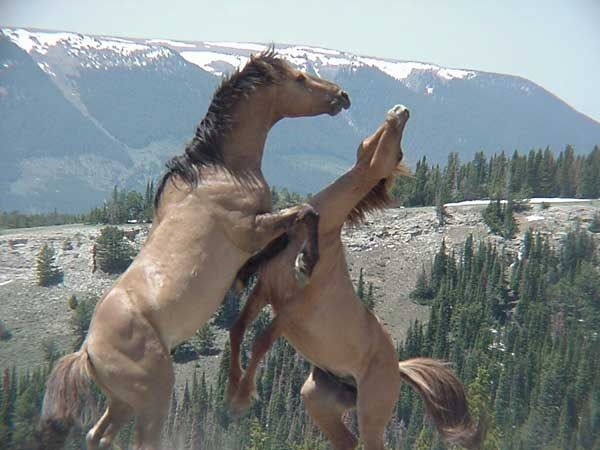
Wild horses in the Pryor Mountains along the Wyoming-Montana border

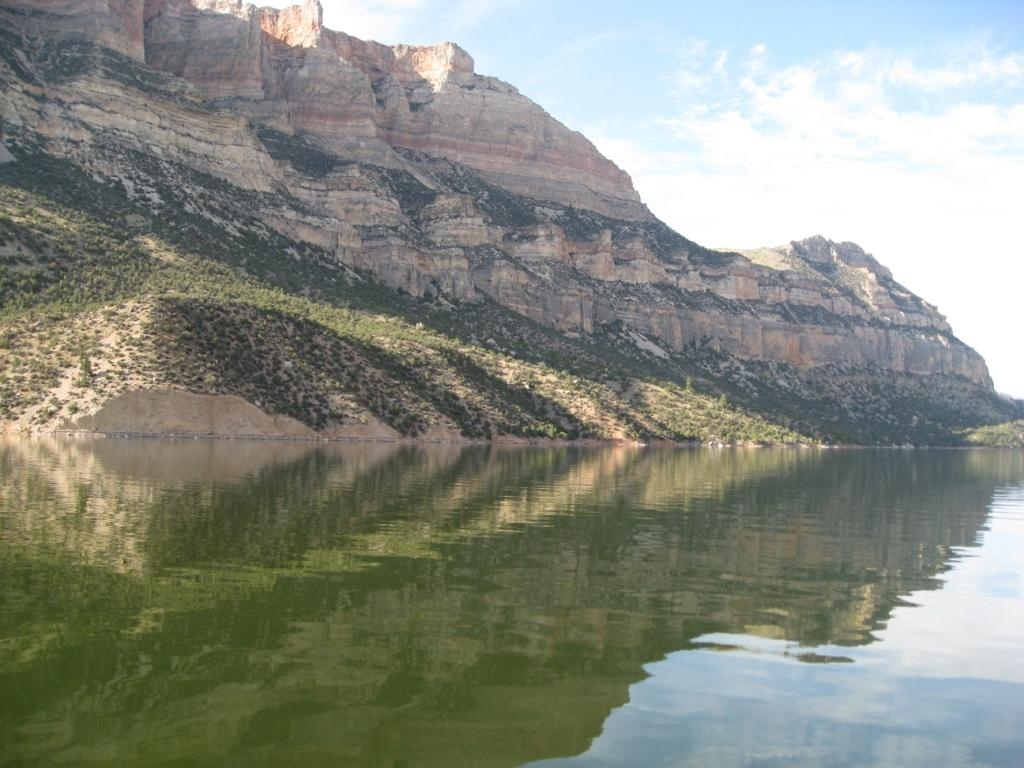
Bighorn Lake in the South District

Bighorn Canyon National Recreation Area is a national recreation area established by an act of Congress on October 15, 1966, following the construction of the Yellowtail Dam by the Bureau of Reclamation. It is one of over 420 sites managed by the U.S. National Park Service. The recreation area spans 120,296.22 acres, straddling the border between Wyoming and Montana. It is divided into two distinct areas, the North District accessed via Fort Smith, Montana and the South District accessed through Lovell, Wyoming. There is no thru road inside the recreation area connecting the two districts. The Yellowtail Dam is located in the North District. It is named after the famous Crow leader Robert Yellowtail, harnesses the waters of the Bighorn River by turning that variable watercourse into Bighorn Lake. The lake extends 71 miles (114 km) through Wyoming and Montana, 55 miles (89 km) of which lie within the national recreation area. The lake provides recreational boating, fishing, water skiing, kayaking, and birding opportunities to visitors. About one third of the park unit is located on the Crow Indian Reservation. Nearly one-quarter of the Pryor Mountains Wild Horse Range lies within the Bighorn Canyon National Recreation Area.

== History ==
=== Early history ===
Archaeologists have found evidence of people living in the vicinity of Bighorn Canyon for as far back as 12,000 years ago. The Bad Pass trail, along the west side of the canyon, provided passage for Indigenous peoples from Bighorn basin to the Grapevine Creek area. The Grapevine Creek area in present day Montana opened up to the plains, where buffalo could be found. Evidence suggests that people did not live along the trail but used it for seasonal passage or migration.

=== Recent history ===
The Crow peoples, also known as Apsáalooke or Absarokaa, migrated to the region of Bighorn Canyon sometime during the 16th Century. Other peoples migrated through the area as well, but by the 18th century the Crow had settled in the Bighorn country. There were clashes with tribes such as the Blackfeet, Sioux, Cheyenne, and several other tribes over the land. In the late 1800s, the Crow aligned themselves with the U.S. Government and were enlisted as scouts. In 1851, the Fort Laramie Treaty (1851) identified 38 million acres of Crow territory. In the Fort Laramie Treaty of 1868, the Crow territory was diminished to eight million acres. Through the 19th century, as more and more land was ceded to the U.S. Government, Bighorn Canyon remained in the heart of Crow country.

By 1950, the federal government had decided to use the Pick-Sloan Flood Control Act of 1944 to dam the Bighorn River and fill the Bighorn Canyon with water. Members of the Crow Tribe were against the building of the dam because Bighorn Canyon is considered a sacred place. Robert Yellowtail, a leader in the Crow Nation and Superintendent from 1934-1945, fought against the building of the dam. The government wanted 7,000 acres of Crow land and offered $1.5 million to buy it. The Crow valued the land at $5 million. Negotiation ensued, and ultimately the government decided to buy 12,000 acres for $5 million. The U.S. Bureau of Reclamation then named the 525 foot structure "Yellowtail Dam" after Robert Yellowtail. By this point the Crow reservation was at the almost 2.3 million acres it is today. The Crow reservation surrounds the northern portion of Bighorn Canyon, but the canyon itself is now owned by the United States Government.

On October 29, 1975, the Bad Pass trail was added to the National Register of Historic Places.

== Park management ==
Bighorn Canyon National Recreation Area is managed as part of a group of parks referred to as the Powder River group. The group also includes Little Bighorn Battlefield National Monument, Fort Laramie National Historic Site, and Devils Tower National Monument. This group of parks is in the Intermountain Region of the National Park Service.

=== Visitor centers ===
Yellowtail Dam Visitor Center is located in Fort Smith, Montana in close proximity to the top of Yellowtail Dam, but is currently closed. The access road to the Yellowtail Dam Visitor Center is also closed. In the South District the Cal S. Taggart Visitor Center is located and Lovell, Wyoming and is open year round. It is closed on Sundays during the fall, winter, and spring.

== Recreation ==
=== Camping and hiking ===
There are seven designated campgrounds in the Bighorn Canyon National Recreation Area. Four of the campgrounds are drive-in and open year round. The largest is Horseshoe Bend Campground in the South District near Lovell, Wyoming. It has 68 sites. Most of its sites are available on a first come, first serve basis, with the exception of five sites available by online reservation. The Trail Creek/Barry's Landing campground is also in the South District with thirty sites. In the North District, the largest campground is Afterbay Campground, consisting of 22 sites. The second drive-in campground in the North District is the Grapevine Campground with fourteen sites. One campground, Medicine Creek, is accessible by boating or hiking in. Medicine Creek Campground has five sites and is located in the South District. The two remaining campgrounds are only accessible by boat and are located in the North District. Black Canyon Campground, with seventeen sites, is located five miles from the Ok-A-Beh Marina. Dayboard 9 Campground has five sites and is approximately nine miles from the Ok-A-Beh Marina.

Backcountry camping is permitted along the reservoir below the high water of 3,640 feet or in undeveloped areas near Bighorn Lake. Fires are not permitted at backcountry campsites. There are two developed waterway campsites located in the canyon at Big Bull Elk Creek and Dry Head Creek.

There are fifteen hiking trails in Bighorn Canyon National Recreation Area with a total of approximately seventeen miles of trails. The North District has 3 trails and the South District has twelve trails. The longest trail in the North District is the Beaver Pond Nature trail and is 2.6 miles long. The longest trail in the South District is the Sykes Trail at 4.6 miles long. There are two trails in the recreation area considered handicap accessible, both located in the South District. One handicap trail is the Visitor Center Pond path and is 0.26 miles long. The other is Two Eagles Interpretive Trail and is 0.25 miles long. Pets are permitted on trails in the recreation area but are required to be leashed.

=== Boating ===
Bighorn Lake offers 12,700 surface acres of water for recreation, with 191 miles of shoreline. There are two marinas in the recreation area. Ok-A-Beh Marina is in the North District and Horseshoe Bend Marina is in the South District. Visitors may use motorboats, kayaks, canoes, stand up paddle boards, or most personal watercraft, provided they have the required state inspections and Aquatic Invasive Species decals. Aquatic Invasive Species (AIS) inspection stations are intended to keep harmful invasive species such as the Quagga mussel or Zebra mussel out of Montana waters. Boats are also required to display a valid registration.

The National Park Service offers free guided kayaking tours on Bighorn Lake during the summer. Concessionaires offer canoe, kayak, and standup paddle board rentals in the South District. Pontoon rentals are available at Ok-A-Beh Marina.

=== Fishing ===
Prior to the construction of the Yellowtail Dam the Bighorn River was a warm water fishery. Following construction, the waters below the dam transformed into a cold tailwater fishery where rainbow and brown trout spawn. Meanwhile, the reservoir behind the dam supports spawning for smallmouth bass, channel catfish, and ling. Montana Department of Fish, Wildlife & Parks stocks the reservoir with walleye and it is managed as a walleye fishery. Largemouth bass, sauger, shovelnose sturgeon, crappie, yellow perch, pumpkinseed, stonecat, and carp are among the fish that may be caught in the reservoir.

Fishing in the Afterbay reservoir is available both by shoreline and by boat. Rainbow trout is the main species of fish caught in Afterbay. For anglers interested in fishing the Bighorn River, there is a boat ramp immediately below Afterbay Dam. In the local town of Fort Smith there are several guiding companies, hunting and fishing lodges, or boat rental companies to service the needs of visiting anglers. Fishing licenses are required when fishing in the National Recreation Area but are issued by the respective states. Anglers are required to have a fishing license for the state they are fishing in.

=== Hunting ===
While hunting is usually not permitted in units managed by the National Park Service, it is permitted in certain areas of Bighorn National Recreation Area. Hunters are required to be knowledgeable of the hunting regulations and strongly encouraged to contact National Park Service rangers in the area prior to hunting. Hunting lodges in Fort Smith offer guides and equipment for hire.

=== Caving ===
The recreation area contains numerous caves. The Bighorn Cavern in particular is used by people interested in caving. Management of Bighorn Canyon National Recreation Area requires cavers to obtain a permit at the Cal S. Taggart visitor center in Lovell, Wyoming. Two parties are permitted which must consist of between three and six people. Each party is required to have a member who is familiar with the cave.

== Ecology ==
=== Fauna ===
Bighorn Canyon provides habitat for at least 231 species of birds. Bighorn sheep, black bear, mule deer, mountain lions, pronghorn, coyotes, beavers, and marmots are among the species that live in the varied climates in the recreation area. The black-tailed prairie dog and the swift fox are both listed as Species of Concern by the Montana Department of Fish, Wildlife, & Parks and inhabit the North District of Bighorn Canyon. The northwestern wolf has been observed in the same region of Wyoming where the South District of Bighorn Canyon is located.

== Climate ==
The North District of Bighorn Canyon is classified as semi-arid and receives an average of 18 inches of rain per year. The South District is a high desert with an annual rainfall of 6 to 10 inches.

== Park features ==
Afterbay Lake, located below Yellowtail Dam, is a popular spot for trout fishing as well as for viewing ducks, geese and other animals. The Bighorn River below the Afterbay Dam is likewise a world-class trout fishing area. In addition, the area features many archeological and historical resources. Visitor centers and other developed facilities are located in Fort Smith, Montana, and near Lovell, Wyoming.

Bighorn Canyon National Recreation Area has four historic ranches within its boundaries:

- L Slash Heart Ranch was owned by Caroline Lockhart, a notable journalist and novelist in the early 1900s. Two of her books were made into silent films in the 1920s.
- Mason-Lovell Ranch was operating during the open range days of the 1880s; the ranch once had 25,000 cattle roaming the entire Bighorn Basin.
- Cedarvale Ranch, located in the ghost town of Hillsboro, Montana, was a dude ranch owned by native New Yorker Grosvener W. "Doc" Barry, and attracted people for vacations. Visitors included Doc Barry's friend President Teddy Roosevelt, but attracting other vacationers proved more difficult.
- Ewing-Snell Ranch is a former family ranch started by Erastus Ewing. Ewing went west to get rich in gold mining, but he was not successful in the gold fields and turned to ranching.

North of Lovell along the Sullivan Knob's Trail is one of the national recreation area's more unusual claims to fame. There a visitor can stand in a certain spot on the canyon rim, shout across the canyon and then hear a "triple echo" in reply.

== See also ==
- Pryor Mountains Wild Horse Range – Wildlife refuge in Montana and Wyoming, US
