= Bighorn River =

River in Wyoming and Montana in the United States

Bighorn River Great Horn River
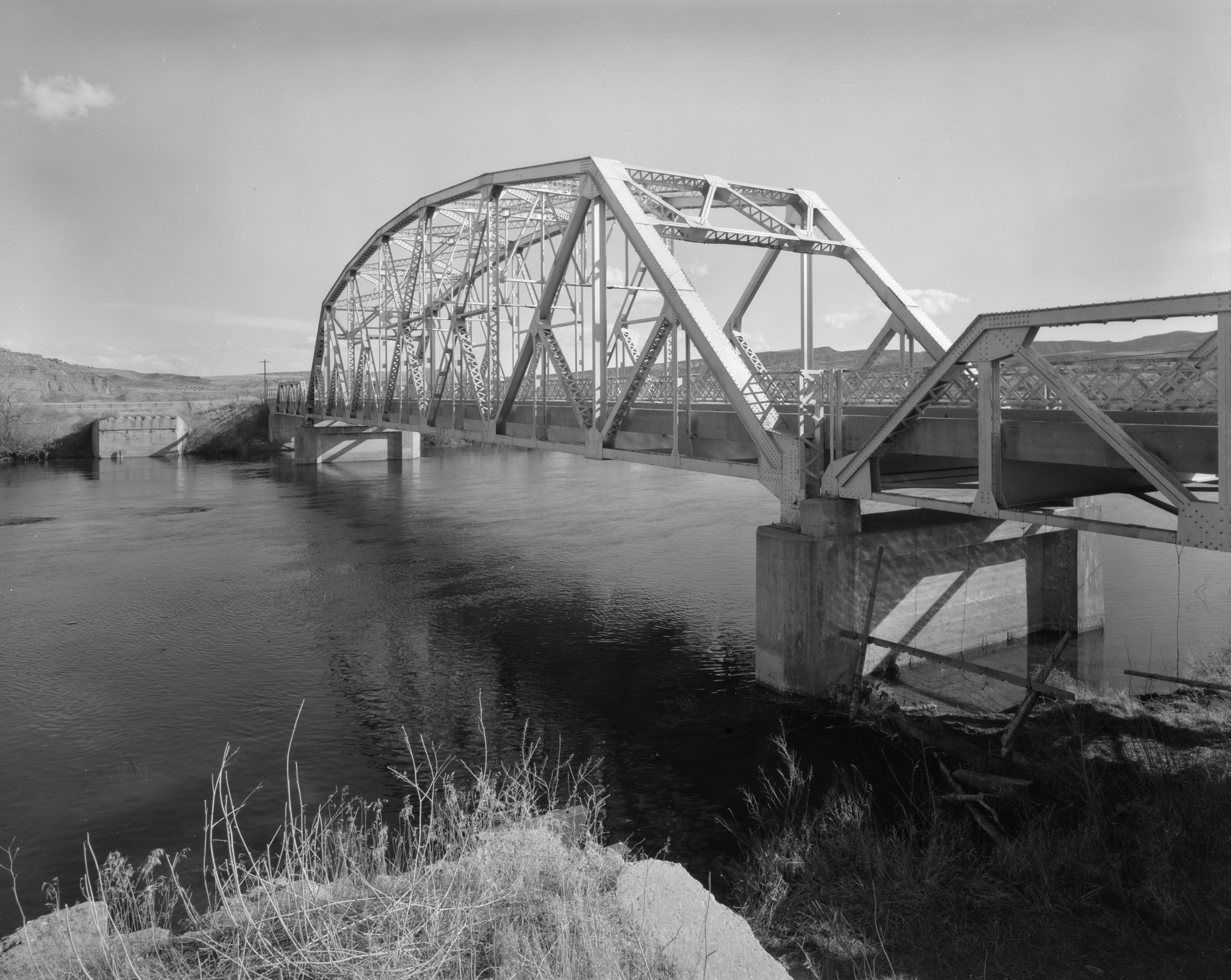
- The CQA Four Mile Bridge over Bighorn River

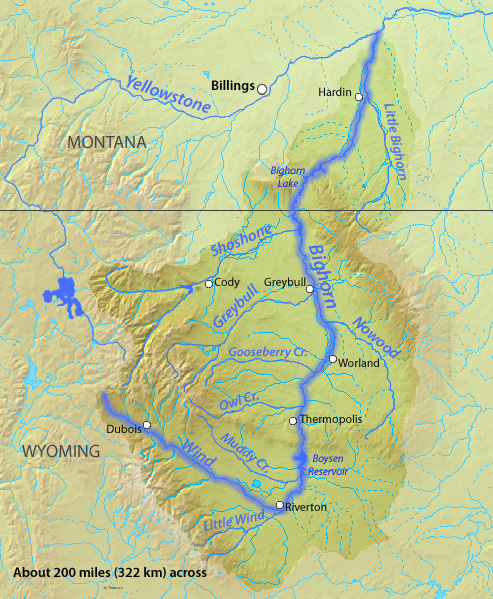
- Map of the Wind-Bighorn River
- Native name: Iisaxpúatahcheeaashisee (Crow)

Location
- Country: United States
- State: Wyoming/Montana
- Cities: Dubois, Crowheart, Johnstown, Riverton, Thermopolis, Lucerne, Kirby, Winchester, South Flat, Mc Nutt, Worland, Washakie Ten, Manderson, Basin, Greybull, Fort Smith

Physical characteristics
- Source: Two Ocean Mountain
  - location: Wind River Range, Teton County
  - coordinates: 43°44′50″N 110°04′27″W
  - elevation: 9,760 ft (2,970 m)
- Mouth: Yellowstone River
  - location: Bighorn, Montana, Treasure County
  - coordinates: 46°09′18″N 107°28′28″W
  - elevation: 2,687 ft (819 m)
- Length: 185 mi (298 km)
- Basin size: 22,885 sq mi (59,270 km^{2})
- Discharge
  - location: Bighorn
  - average: 3,954 cu ft/s (112.0 m^{3}/s)

Basin features
- Tributaries
  - left: East Fork Wind River, Greybull River, Shoshone River
  - right: Little Wind River, Nowood River, Little Bighorn River

The Bighorn River is a tributary of the Yellowstone, approximately 461 miles (742 km) long, in the states of Wyoming and Montana in the western United States. The river was named in 1805 by fur trader François Larocque for the bighorn sheep he saw along its banks as he explored the Yellowstone.

The upper reaches of the Bighorn, south of the Owl Creek Mountains in Wyoming, are known as the Wind River. The two rivers are sometimes referred to as the Wind/Bighorn. The Wind River officially becomes the Bighorn River at the Wedding of the Waters, on the north side of the Wind River Canyon near the town of Thermopolis. From there, the river flows through the Bighorn Basin in north central Wyoming, passing through Thermopolis and Hot Springs State Park.

At the border with Montana, the river turns northeast, and flows past the north end of the Bighorn Mountains, through the Crow Indian Reservation, where the Yellowtail Dam forms the Bighorn Lake reservoir. The reservoir and the surrounding canyon are part of the Bighorn Canyon National Recreation Area.

The Little Bighorn River joins the Bighorn near the town of Hardin, Montana. Approximately 50 miles (80 km) farther downriver, the Bighorn River ends where it joins the Yellowstone.

== Course ==
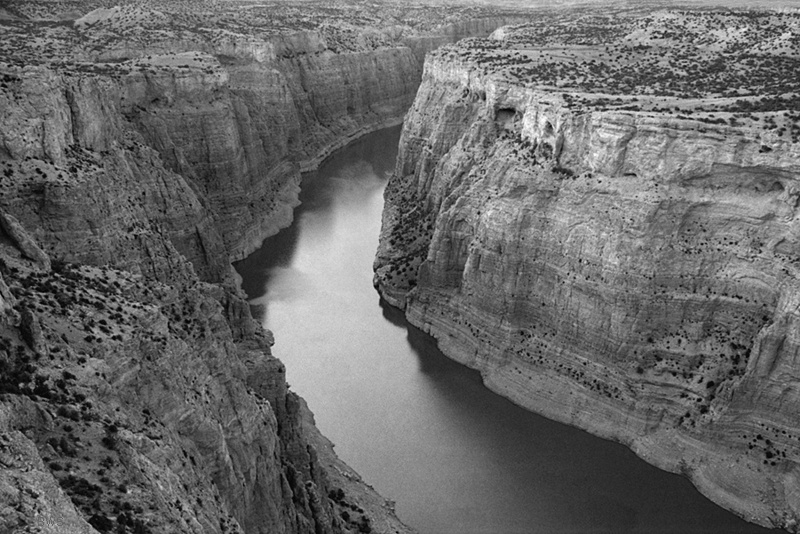
The river carves a canyon through Bighorn Canyon National Recreation Area

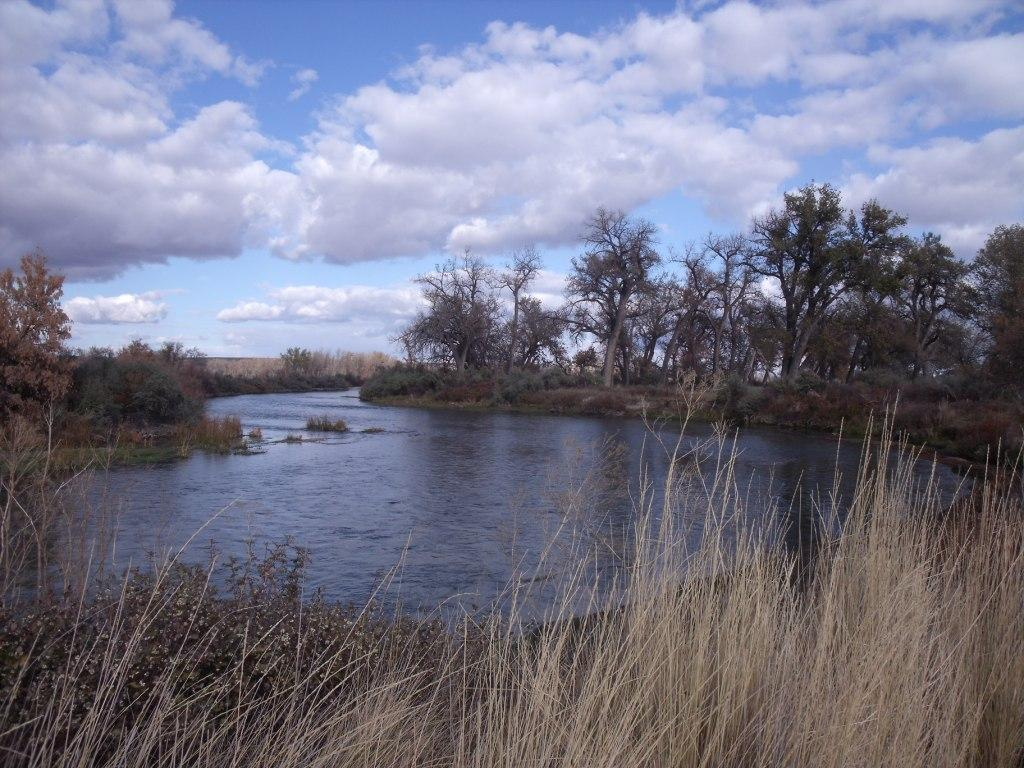
Bighorn River in Montana

The Bighorn River begins as the Wind River in the Rocky Mountains at Wind River Lake, near Two Ocean Mountain and the summit of Togwotee Pass. The Wind River flows southeast receiving the east fork of the Wind River from the north, and enters the Wind River Basin, flowing past Dubois and Johnstown, to Riverton, where it receives the Little Wind River. The river then changes direction to the northeast and then the north, flowing into Boysen Reservoir, which is formed by Boysen Dam. Below the dam it enters the Wind River Canyon, where the river narrows and forms many rapids. At the end of the canyon the Wind River widens out in an area called the Wedding of the Waters where it becomes the Bighorn River and enters the Bighorn Basin. The Bighorn continues northward, passing through Thermopolis, Worland, and Basin. At Greybull it receives the Greybull River, and about 30 mi (48 km) north of that confluence it enters Bighorn Lake, where it is joined by the Shoshone River. North of the confluence with the Shoshone, the reservoir narrows as the river enters the Bighorn Canyon, where it crosses into Montana. At the end of the canyon, the river passes through Yellowtail Dam and Afterbay Dam. The river turns to the northeast and enters the Great Plains. At Hardin the river is joined by the Little Bighorn River. Approximately 50 mi (80 km) downriver from the Little Bighorn, in Big Horn County, the Bighorn empties into the Yellowstone.

== Names ==
The Bighorn River has also been known as the Great Horn River, Le Corne and Iisaxpúatahcheeaashisee in the Apsáalooke language which translates to English as Large Bighorn Sheep River. Its Gros Ventre name is ʔɔ́tééíníícááh, 'wild sheep river'. Its Lakota name is Héčhiŋškayapi Wakpá, ‘Bighorn River’.

== See also ==
- List of rivers of Montana
- List of rivers of Wyoming
- Montana Stream Access Law
