= National Register of Historic Places listings in Rosebud County, Montana =

Location of Rosebud County in Montana

This is a list of the National Register of Historic Places listings in Rosebud County, Montana. It is intended to be a complete list of the properties and districts on the National Register of Historic Places in Rosebud County, Montana, United States. The locations of National Register properties and districts for which the latitude and longitude coordinates are included below, may be seen in a map.

There are 25 properties and districts listed on the National Register in the county, including 1 National Historic Landmark.

This National Park Service list is complete through NPS recent listings posted December 19, 2025.

== Listings county-wide ==
	Name on the Register	Image	Date listed	Location	City or town	Description
1	Herman and Hannah Anderson House	Herman and Hannah Anderson House	February 12, 1990 (#90000084)	209 S. 7th Ave. 46°15′43″N 106°40′48″W	Forsyth	
2	Blue Front Rooming House	Blue Front Rooming House	February 12, 1990 (#90000085)	1187 Main St. 46°16′02″N 106°40′32″W	Forsyth	
3	Bones Brothers Ranch		March 19, 2004 (#04000220)	Along Hanging Woman Creek, 3 miles southeast of Birney and west of Custer National Forest; 45°17′16″N 106°29′16″W	Birney	
4	J.A. Bookman General Store	J.A. Bookman General Store	September 2, 1994 (#94001067)	Main St. 46°34′39″N 107°22′24″W	Ingomar	
5	Brotherhood of Locomotive Engineers Hall	Brotherhood of Locomotive Engineers Hall	February 12, 1990 (#90000086)	262 S. 7th Ave. 46°15′42″N 106°40′49″W	Forsyth	
6	Cold Springs Ranch House	Cold Springs Ranch House	January 26, 1990 (#89002347)	U.S. Route 12, W. 46°16′46″N 106°43′09″W	Forsyth	
7	Deer Medicine Rocks	Deer Medicine Rocks	March 12, 2012 (#12000244)	45°41′42″N 106°41′30″W	Lame Deer vicinity	
8	First Presbyterian Church and Manse	First Presbyterian Church and Manse	February 12, 1990 (#90000089)	1160-1180 Cedar St. 46°16′03″N 106°40′32″W	Forsyth	
9	Forsyth Bridge	Forsyth Bridge	February 12, 1990 (#90000090)	3rd Ave. at the Yellowstone River; 46°16′00″N 106°41′28″W	Forsyth	Pennsylvania truss span over the Yellowstone River; the one surviving span out of three which comprised the first bridge connecting Rosebud County's northern and southern sections. County was formed out of Custer County partly to ensure this bridge would be built.
10	Forsyth Main Street Historic District	Forsyth Main Street Historic District	February 12, 1990 (#90000081)	Roughly bounded by Cedar St., 11th Ave., Main St., and 8th St. 46°15′57″N 106°40′42″W	Forsyth	
11	Forsyth Residential Historic District	Forsyth Residential Historic District	February 12, 1990 (#90000082)	Roughly bounded by Cedar St., 11th Ave., Willow St., 12th Ave., Oak St., and 14th Ave. 46°16′11″N 106°40′35″W	Forsyth	
12	Forsyth Water Pumping Station	Forsyth Water Pumping Station	February 12, 1990 (#90000087)	3rd Ave. at the Yellowstone River; 46°15′58″N 106°41′23″W	Forsyth	
13	Head Chief-Young Mule Charge		August 7, 2024 (#100010680)	Immediately east of Chief Dull Knife College; 45°37′33″N 106°39′47″W	Lame Deer	
14	Howard School		December 23, 2004 (#04001381)	Old Montana Highway 10; 46°16′12″N 106°53′58″W	Forsyth	
15	Ingomar Public School	Ingomar Public School	September 2, 1994 (#94001068)	2nd Ave. 46°34′38″N 107°22′17″W	Ingomar	
16	Claude O. Marcyes House	Claude O. Marcyes House	February 12, 1990 (#90000088)	390 S. 7th Ave. 46°15′38″N 106°40′45″W	Forsyth	
17	Milk River Bridge		December 29, 2025 (#100012497)	Northside of Malta in Trafton Park; 48°21′49″N 107°52′26″W	Malta vicinity	
18	Poker Jim Butte Fire Lookout		September 1, 2022 (#100008167)	FS Rd. 4801; 45°19′29″N 106°21′56″W	Custer Gallatin National Forest	
19	Rosebud County Courthouse	Rosebud County Courthouse	April 17, 1986 (#86000807)	1250 Main St. 46°16′04″N 106°40′28″W	Forsyth	
20	Rosebud County Deaconess Hospital	Rosebud County Deaconess Hospital	November 16, 1979 (#79001425)	N. 17th Ave; 46°16′17″N 106°40′10″W	Forsyth	
21	St. Philip's Episcopal Church	St. Philip's Episcopal Church	November 20, 2007 (#07001232)	701 Main St. 46°16′33″N 106°26′24″W	Rosebud	
22	Shy Brothers Mercantile		December 22, 2025 (#100012384)	104 Main Street; 45°35′24″N 106°15′47″W	Ashland	
23	Vananda Historic District	Vananda Historic District	April 19, 1990 (#90000629)	U.S. Route 12, 17 miles west of Forsyth; 46°23′29″N 107°00′07″W	Forsyth	
24	Wiley, Clark & Greening Bank	Wiley, Clark & Greening Bank	September 2, 1994 (#94001069)	Main St. 46°34′39″N 107°22′24″W	Ingomar	
25	Wolf Mountains Battlefield-Where Big Crow walked Back and Forth	Wolf Mountains Battlefield-Where Big Crow walked Back and Forth	January 10, 2001 (#00001617)	About four miles southwest of Birney, along the Tongue River; 45°17′18″N 106°34′53″W	Birney	

== See also ==
- List of National Historic Landmarks in Montana
- National Register of Historic Places listings in Montana
