= Deer Medicine Rocks =

- U.S. National Register of Historic Places
- U.S. National Historic Landmark
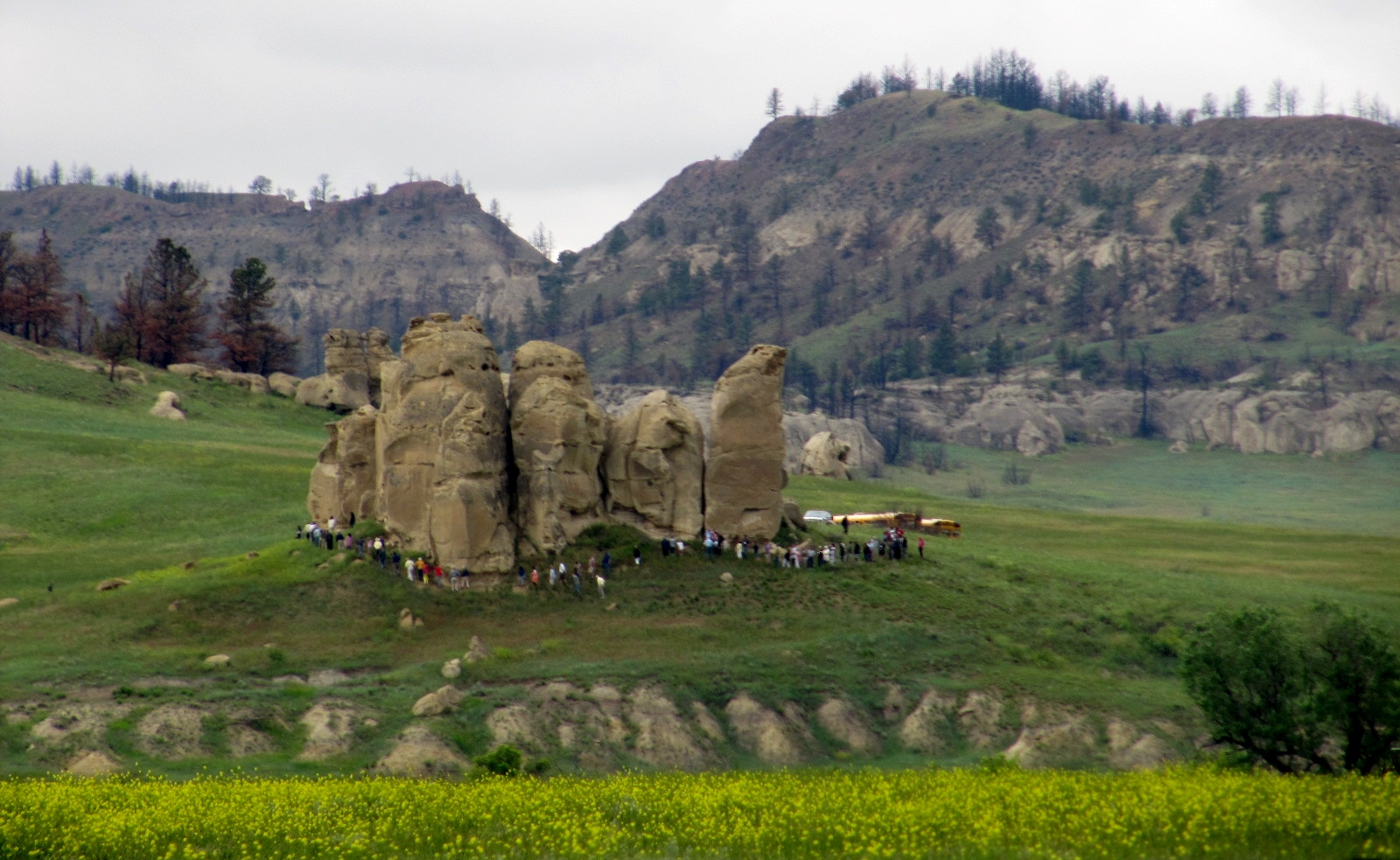

- Location within Montana Location within the United States
- Nearest city: Lame Deer, Montana
- Coordinates: 45°41′42″N 106°41′30″W
- NRHP reference No.: 12000244

Significant dates
- Added to NRHP: March 12, 2012
- Designated NHL: March 12, 2012

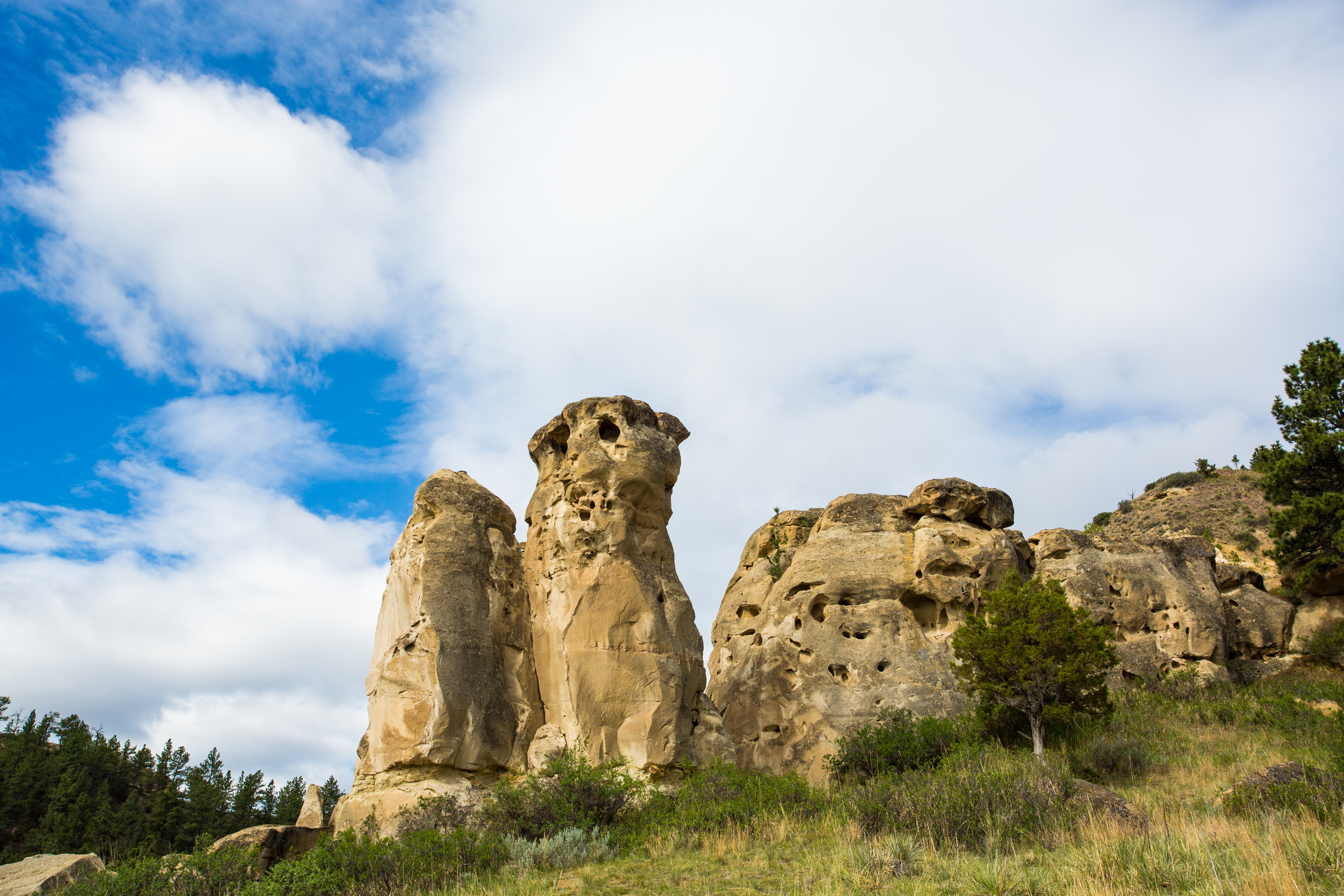
Sandstone formations at Deer Medicine Rocks

Deer Medicine Rocks (Siouan: literal translation "Antler Rocks") is a sandstone formation located on the west bank of Rosebud Creek in the vicinity of Lame Deer, Montana, United States. The formation is significant for its association with the Great Sioux War of 1876-77, and its connection with Sitting Bull's visionary sun dance of early June 1876 which prophesied victory at the Battle of the Little Bighorn. At its nomination to National Historic Landmark status in 2011, it was described as the only site to offer "a wholly Native American historical interpretation of the Battle of the Little Big Horn."

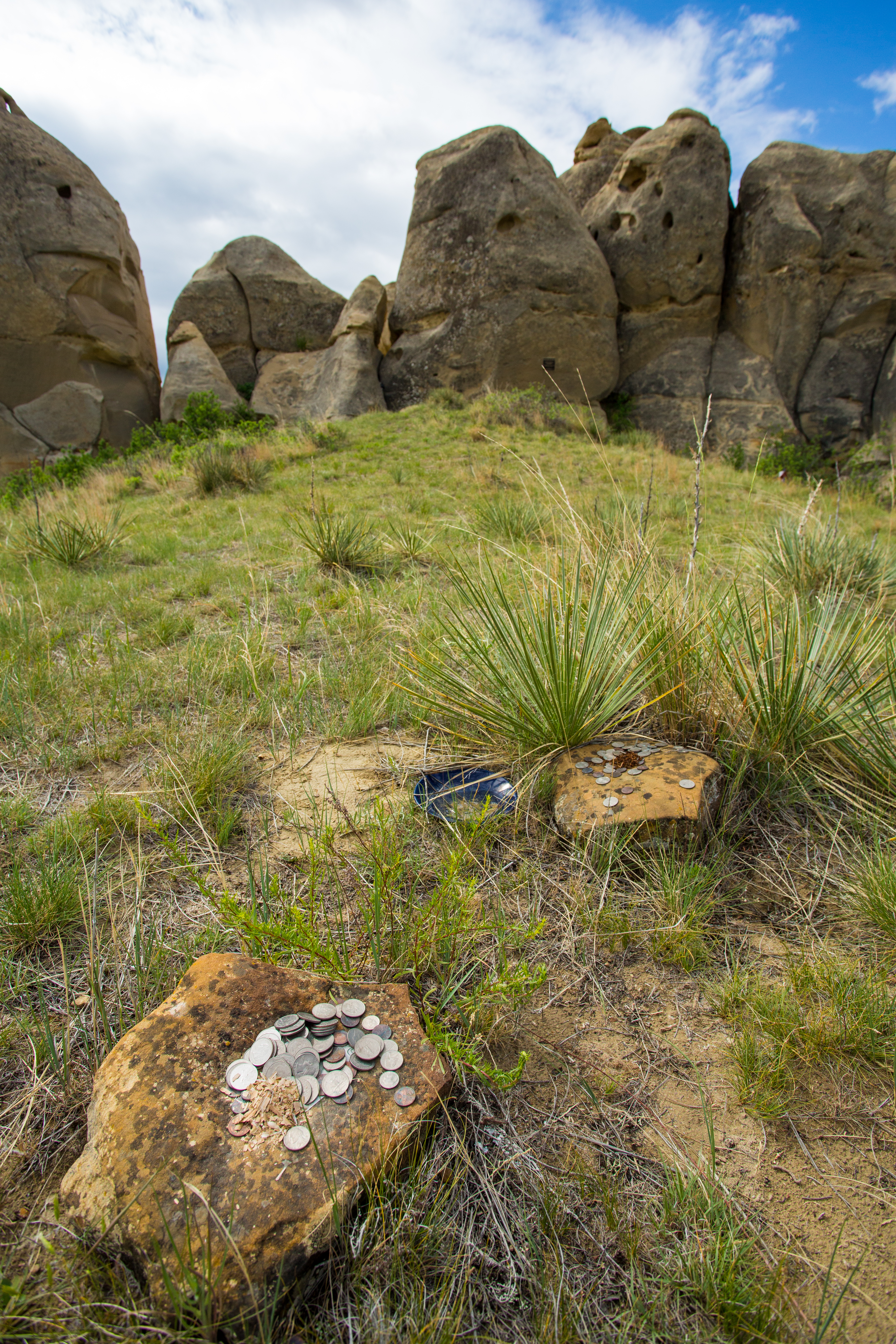
Coins are placed on stones at the base of Deer Medicine Rock as a prayer offering.

This is located on private property and you need a tribal member to take you there.

== Description ==
The Deer Medicine Rocks are located on the west bank of Rosebud Creek. They are formed out of a sandstone promontory originally part of the hills that rise west of the creek, with erosive forces removing the intervening material. The formation rises about 50 feet (15 m) above the surrounding terrain. The surfaces at its base have numerous rock art panels. Expert opinion is divided on the ages of much of this artwork, with age ranges proposed from 1000 to 4000 years ago. Some of the artwork is clearly post-contact origin, depicting cowboys, horses, and guns. The panels depict themes and images common to other rock art sites found throughout the region.

One particular panel shows soldiers with long grasshopper legs falling into a camp. This is interpreted by the Lakota and Cheyenne as showing the vision of Sitting Bull in which he predicted the victory at Little Big Horn during a sun dance held here. The sun dance took place during a major encampment that probably involved more than 3,000 Native Americans from several tribal groups. The Deer Medicine Rocks are the first National Historic Landmark designated for its association with the Great Sioux War that is not a battlefield, and the first to provide a distinctly native view of the campaign.

== See also ==
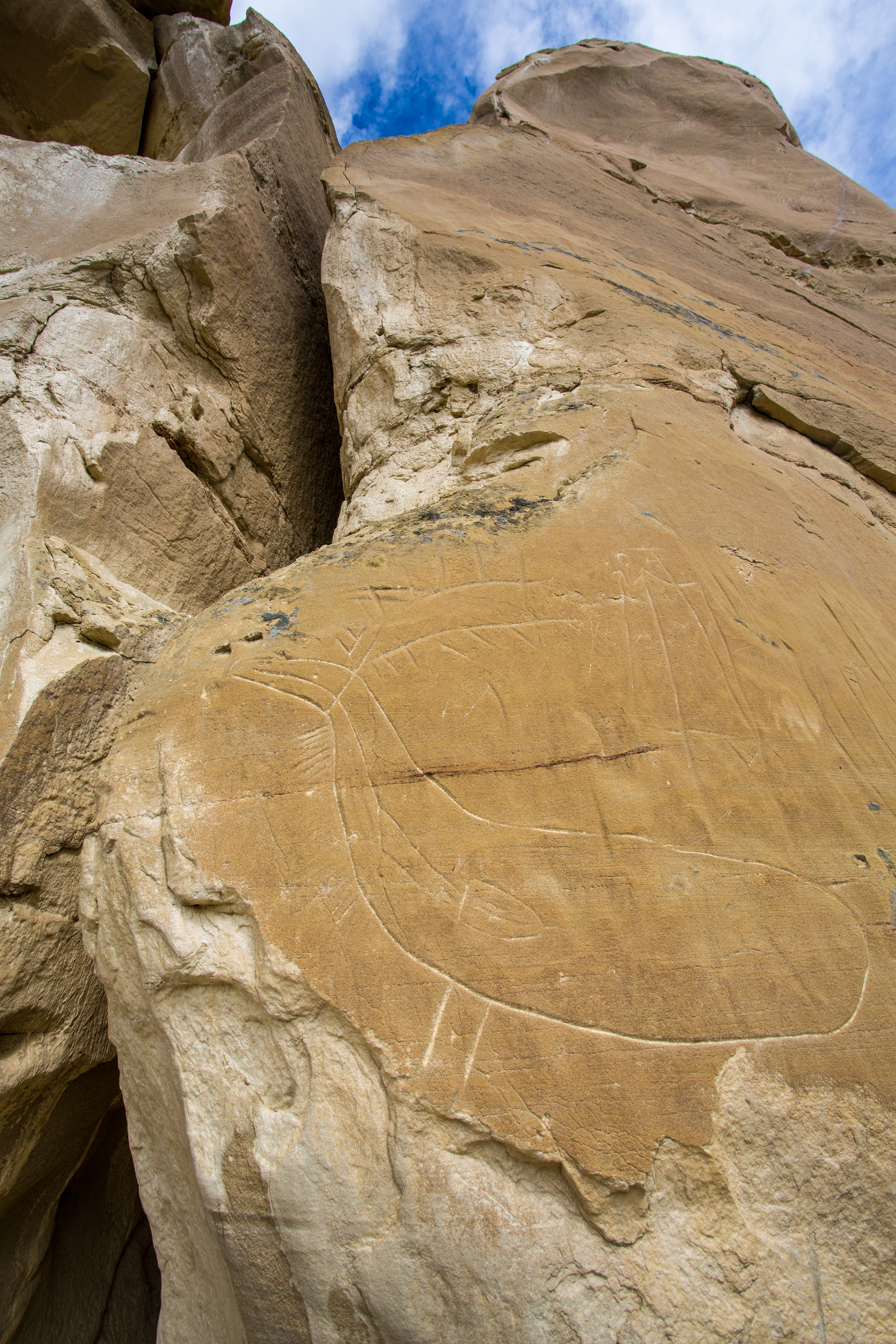
A petroglyph of a deer carved into Deer Medicine Rocks in Montana.

- Medicine Rock State Historic Site
- Medicine Rocks State Park
- List of National Historic Landmarks in Montana
- National Register of Historic Places listings in Rosebud County, Montana
