= Cold Springs Ranch House =

Historic house in Montana, United States

- U.S. National Register of Historic Places
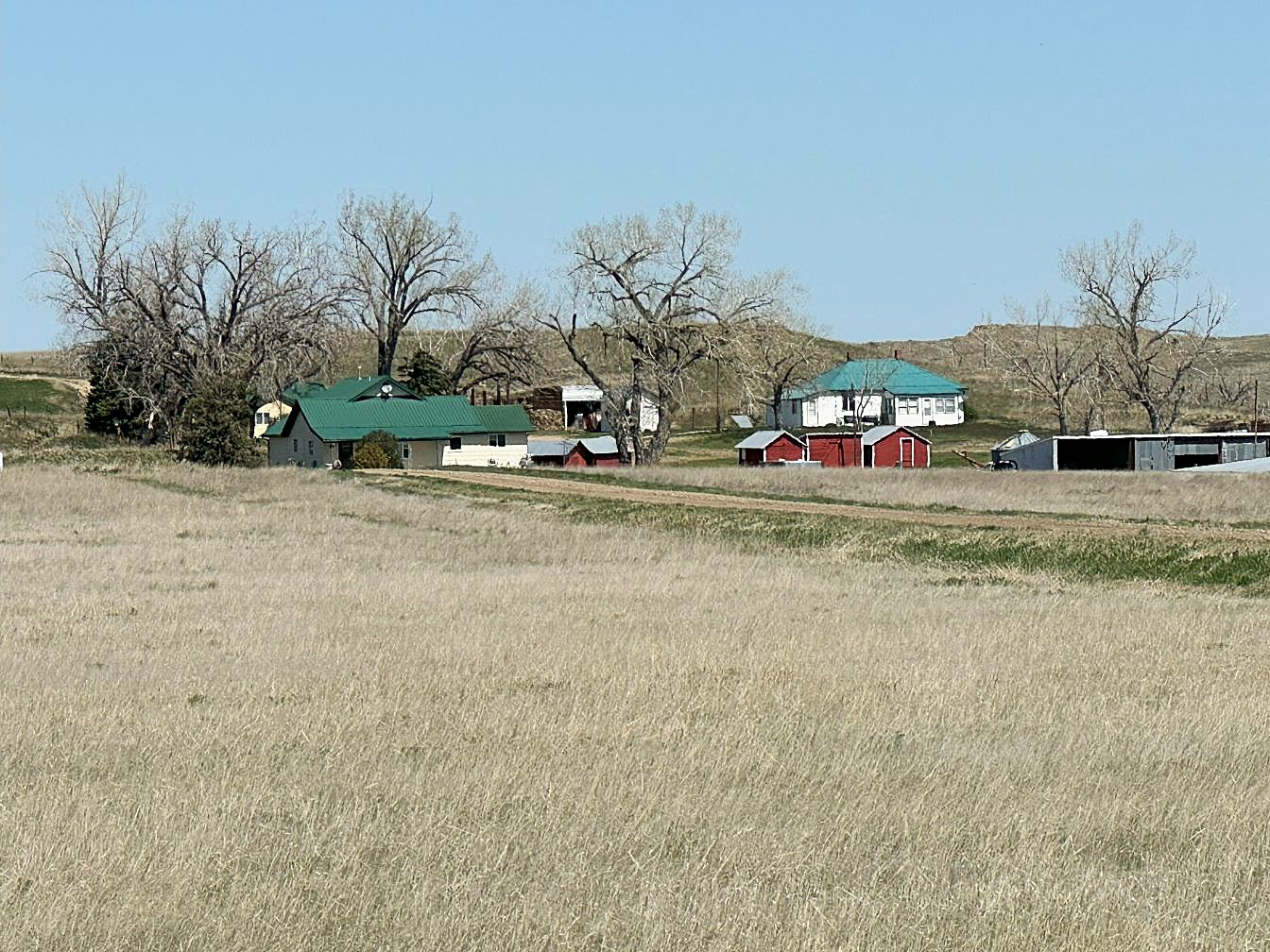
- The ranch in 2025

- Location within Montana Location within the United States
- Location: U.S. Route 12 W., about three miles west-northwest of Forsyth, Montana
- Coordinates: 46°16′46″N 106°43′09″W
- Area: less than one acre
- Built: 1908
- Architectural style: Rustic log
- NRHP reference No.: 89002347
- Added to NRHP: January 26, 1990

The Cold Springs Ranch House near Forsyth, Montana is a log house built in 1908. It was listed on the National Register of Historic Places in 1990.

The ranch house is a 1 1/2-story building built of peeled, hewn cottonwood logs. It is located on the north side of U.S. Route 12, about 3 miles (4.8 km) west-northwest of Forsyth.

It was deemed "significant as the principal residence and headquarters site of Rosebud County's largest late 19th/early 20th century cattle and sheep ranching operation. This ranch once controlled some 15,000 acres (61 km^{2}) of grazing land in northern Rosebud County; as such, it was a substantial force in the region's early history. The home is architecturally significant, as well; it was one of the largest most elegant ranch homes in early 20th century eastern Montana. Its highly rustic cottonwood-log exterior "fits" its environment quite well and shows evidence of extremely careful craftsmanship. Most of the home's original exterior character remains in evidence today, preserving its status as one of Montana's finest large ranch homes."

The ranch was founded in 1877, soon after Custer's defeat at the Battle of Little Bighorn, as part of settlement supported by increased military presence in the area.
