= Medicine Rock State Historic Site =

- U.S. National Register of Historic Places
- Nearest city: Heil, North Dakota
- Area: 1 acre (0.40 ha)
- NRHP reference No.: 86002757
- Added to NRHP: September 25, 1986

Medicine Rock State Historic Site near Heil, North Dakota was listed on the National Register of Historic Places in 1986. Other names associated with the site are Medicine Hill, Medicine Butte, Me-me-ho-pa, Medicine Stone, and Miho.

It is the largest of six sites in North Dakota with rock art paintings, and was the location of ceremonies, and has been long known to natives and non-natives. Lewis and Clark did not visit it but wrote of it.

== See also ==
- Medicine Rocks State Park
- Deer Medicine Rocks
