= Rosebud County Deaconess Hospital =

- U.S. National Register of Historic Places
- Location within Montana
- Location: N. 17th Ave, Forsyth, Montana
- Coordinates: 46°16′17″N 106°40′10″W
- Area: 9.6 acres (3.9 ha)
- Built: 1920-21
- Architect: McIver, Cohagen & Marshall
- Architectural style: Georgian Revival
- NRHP reference No.: 79001425
- Added to NRHP: November 16, 1979

The Rosebud County Deaconess Hospital, on N. 17th Ave in Forsyth, Montana, was built in 1920–21. It was listed on the National Register of Historic Places in 1979.

The public hospital was built at a cost of $90,000 during 1920–21. It is a two-story building with a "daylight basement" which originally provided 21 beds and a surgery room. A nursing home addition was completed in 1958.

The hospital was deemed significant for its historic associations with the settling of Rosebud County and Eastern Montana. It functioned as one of the earliest medical facilities for the settlers of this area.

The hospital was operated by the Lutheran Hospital and Homes Society of Fargo, North Dakota until 1959, when the Rosebud Treasure Hospital Association was incorporated to take over the hospital and provide a nursing home complex serving Rosebud County and neighboring Treasure County.

A new hospital building, completed in 1973, replaced use of the historic building. At the time of NRHP registration in 1978, the historic building was occupied by various county departments and there were plans for part of the building to be used as a health clinic.
