= Forsyth Bridge =

- U.S. National Register of Historic Places
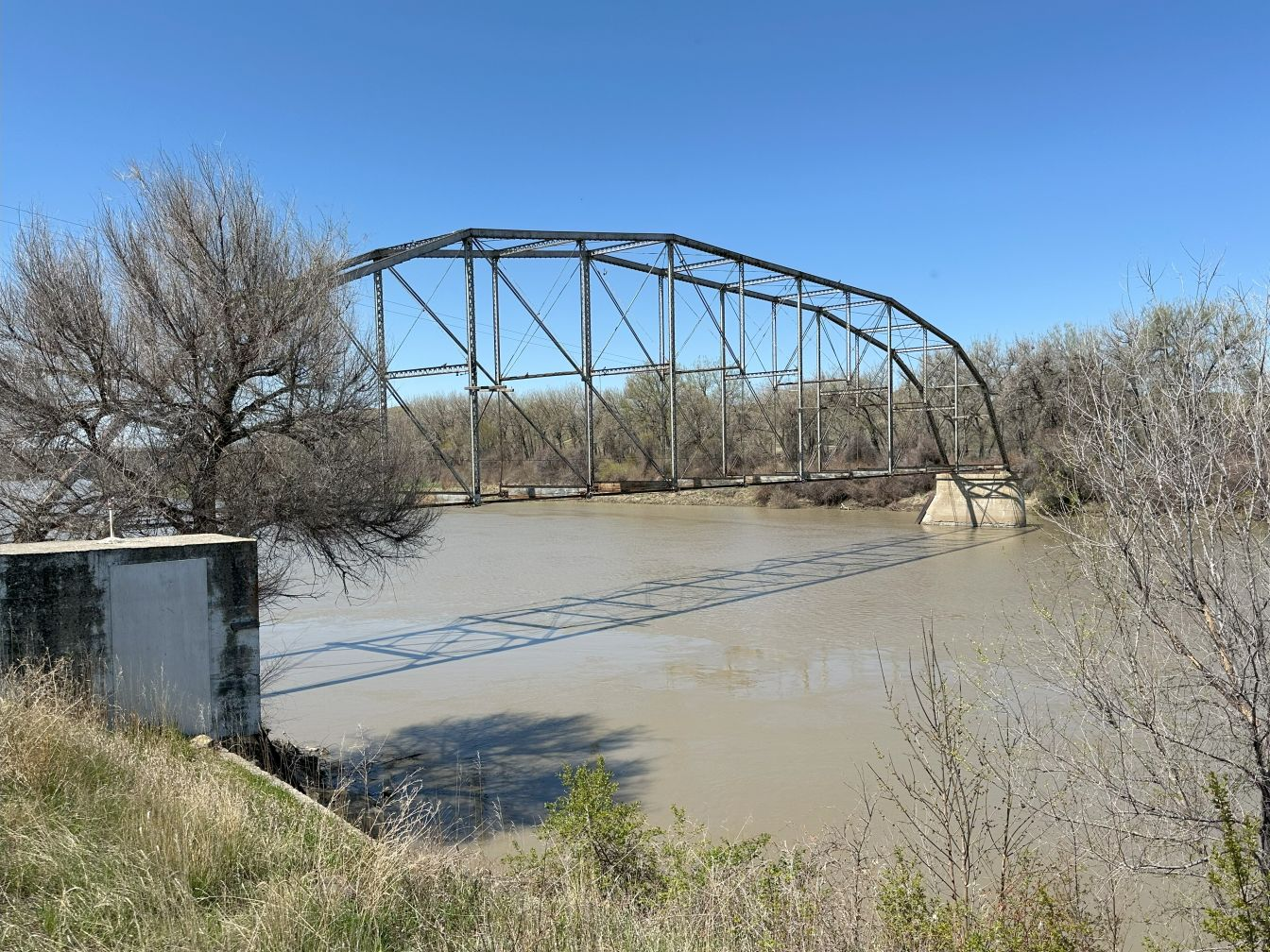
- The bridge structure in 2025

- Location within Montana Location within the United States
- Location: 3rd Ave. at the Yellowstone River, Forsyth, Montana
- Coordinates: 46.266736°N 106.691130°W
- Area: less than one acre
- Built: 1905
- Built by: H.W. Hewett & Co.
- Architectural style: Pennsylvania truss bridge
- MPS: Forsyth MPS
- NRHP reference No.: 90000090
- Added to NRHP: February 12, 1990

The Forsyth Bridge across the Yellowstone River in Forsyth, Montana is a Pennsylvania truss bridge which was built in 1905. It has also been known as Yellowstone River Bridge. It was listed on the National Register of Historic Places in 1990.

The bridge is important historically as the first bridge linking what is now the northern section of Rosebud County to its southern section; the nearest Yellowston River bridge crossing was in Miles City, about 45 miles (72 km) downstream. The need for the bridge was deeply felt locally and was a major factor in the area's initiative to create the county, splitting the area off of Custer County so that this bridge would be built.

When listed, only one of the bridge's three spans survived. The span is a pin-connected Pennsylvania through truss about 200 feet (61 m) long and about 16 feet (4.9 m) wide.
