= Wolf Mountains Battlefield =

- Wolf Mountains Battlefield-Where Big Crow walked Back and Forth
- U.S. National Register of Historic Places
- U.S. National Historic Landmark District
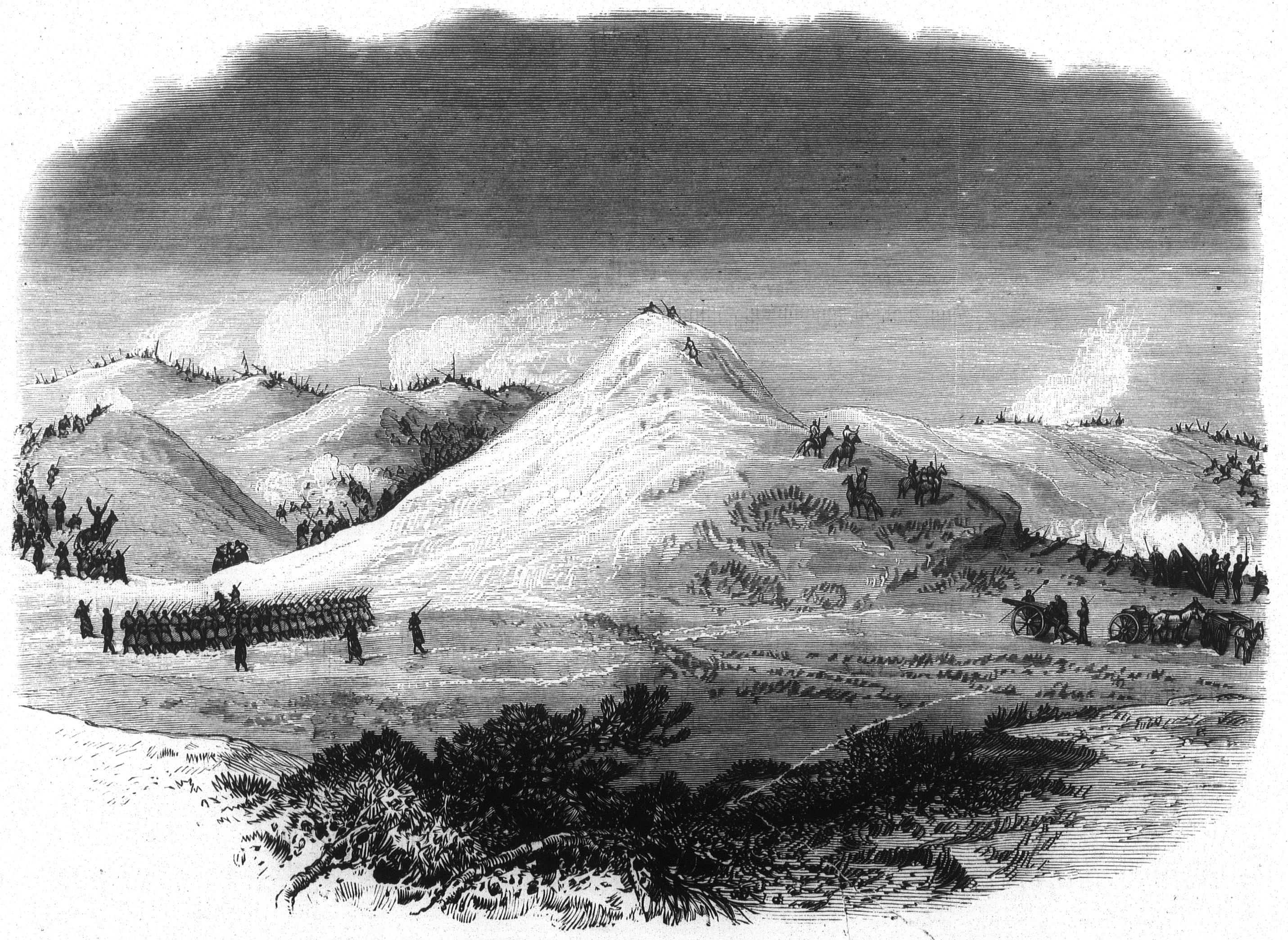
- c. 1877 engraved depiction of the battle

- Location within Montana Location within the United States
- Nearest city: Birney, Montana
- Coordinates: 45°17′17.628″N 106°34′53.256″W
- Area: 2,756 acres (1,115 ha)
- Built: 1877
- NRHP reference No.: 00001617

Significant dates
- Added to NRHP: January 10, 2001
- Designated NHLD: October 6, 2008

Wolf Mountains Battlefield/Where Big Crow Walked Back and Forth was the site of the Battle of Wolf Mountain, the last major combat of the Great Sioux War of 1876–77. It was added to the National Register of Historic Places in 2001, and was designated a National Historic Landmark in 2008.

== History ==
The Great Sioux War was about the desire of settlers and prospectors to encroach on the land assured to the Sioux by treaty. Both sides allegedly perpetrated encroachments on or off the reservation. The Battle of Rosebud and the tribal victory at Little Big Horn on June 25, 1876 were in the early part of the war. The ability of the tribes to wage war for an extended time was undermined by their inability to amass food stores to get them through the winter at the same time.

On January 7, 1877, soldiers established an encampment to the west of the river on the eastern half of the battlefield. The encampment was backed by tall bluffs. The Battle of Wolf Mountains took place on January 8, 1877. On January 9, a rifle pit was constructed by F Company, Twenty-second infantry at a lookout site atop a rock wall. The rifle pit can still be seen, and is the only contributing structure on the site.

Crazy Horse and his Oglala band together with the Lakota and Cheyenne warriors fighting with him had an initial position atop a canyon wall on the east side of the river, and were able to rain rifle fire down upon the soldiers. They were later driven from this position by the soldiers.

Both sides suffered some injury and loss of life. The Cheyenne medicine man Big Crow was among those who died here. The battle and the ensuing freezing temperatures and starvation so weakened the tribal coalition, that by May 6, 1877, Crazy Horse and his men surrendered, ending the conflict.

== Battlefield preservation ==
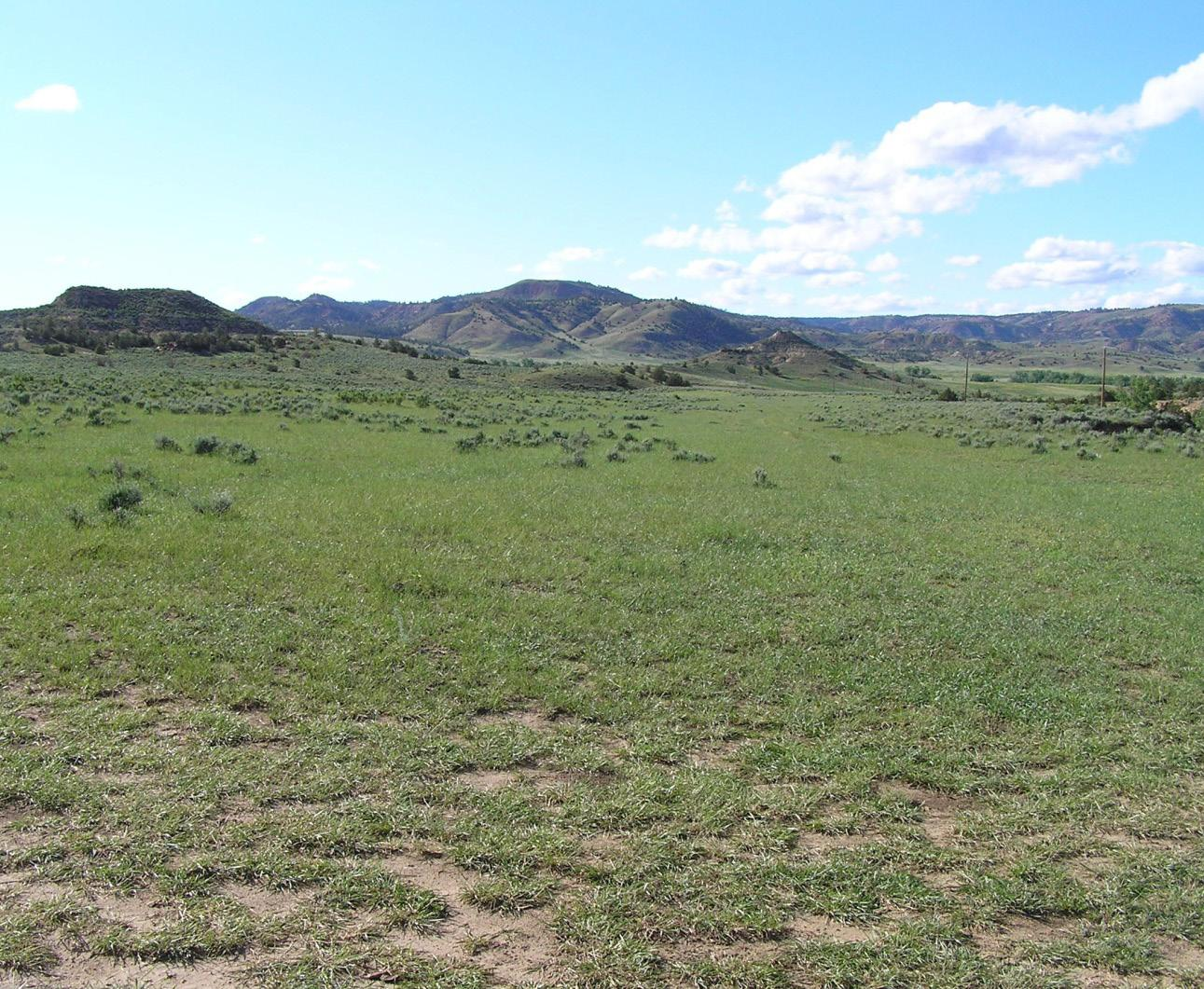
Undated Park Service photo

The battlefield is located in the Tongue River Valley, near Birney, Montana. The river runs through a series of deep curves in an overall northeasterly direction. Within the National Historic Landmark, the river runs alternately through flood plains and along towering rock walls. The battlefield runs along the river for around two miles and spans the width of the valley for about two-and-a-half miles. In addition to the river, there are also streams running through the battlefield. In spite of the modern intrusion of two unpaved roads, a series of utility wires and poles, the agricultural use of the area, and growth of trees and vegetation, it retains much of the look and feel it would have had at the time of the battle. Potential archeological exploration may be hindered by the history of searches by relic hunters with metal detectors.

It was added to the National Register of Historic Places in 2001,

The site is potentially threatened by development of coal bed methane production. A Northern Cheyenne Nation report in 2006 stated: "Steve Brady discussed the status of the Rosebud Battlefield State Park. The purpose of holding such an event is to (1) commemorate two battles that do not receive as much attention as the Battle of the Little Bighorn, and to (2) educate people about the potential coal bed methane development on and near the historic and cultural sites of the Rosebud Battlefield and the Battle of Wolf Mountains site. Brady updated the Indian and non-Indian audience of the Rosebud Battlefield’s status in becoming a National Historic Landmark, on the same level as the Little Bighorn Battlefield."

It was designated a National Historic Landmark by signature of the Secretary of the Interior on October 7, 2008.

== See also ==
- List of National Historic Landmarks in Montana
- National Register of Historic Places listings in Rosebud County, Montana
