= Bones Brothers Ranch =

- U.S. National Register of Historic Places
- Location within Montana Location within the United States
- Location: about 3 miles southeast of Birney, Montana and west of Custer National Forest
- Coordinates: 45°17′16″N 106°29′16″W
- Area: 4,000 acres (16 km^{2})
- Built by: Alderson, Irving Jr.; et.al.
- Architectural style: Rustic
- NRHP reference No.: 04000220
- Added to NRHP: March 19, 2004

The Bones Brothers Ranch, in the Tongue River Valley in Rosebud County, Montana near Birney, Montana, also known as the Z.T. Cox Ranch, was listed on the National Register of Historic Places in 2004.

The listing included 22 contributing buildings, two contributing structures, and six contributing sites.

It is located at the confluence of Hanging Woman Creek and the East Fork of Hanging Woman Creek.

The buildings in the listing are mostly log and stone structures. These include a group of four ranch family log houses along the East Fork.

It was deemed significant for its

historic association with the evolution of the livestock industry and land settlement of the Tongue River Valley and its tributaries in southeastern Montana. In 1896, Zachary T. Cox received his homestead patent for 160 acres at this present-day ranch location where he had resided since 1889. Therefore the genesis of the Bones Brothers Ranch or the former Z. T. Cox Ranch occurred after the "Hard Winter" of 1886-1887 during the transition from open range to fenced pastures. The ranch developed at the end of the open range boom period of the 1880s in eastern Montana where the large corporations overstocked and overgrazed the ranges. The winter of 1886-1887 devastated the existing herds and brought a new consciousness regarding ranching. The Z. T. Cox Ranch (Bones Brothers Ranch today) represents the beginnings of small cattle operations that incorporated summer and winter pastures and supplemental feed.
