= Howard School (Forsyth, Montana) =

- U.S. National Register of Historic Places
- Location within Montana Location within the United States
- Nearest city: Forsyth, Montana
- Coordinates: 46°16′12″N 106°53′58″W
- Area: 0.4 acres (0.16 ha)
- Built: 1905
- NRHP reference No.: 04001381
- Added to NRHP: December 23, 2004

The Howard School in Rosebud County near Forsyth, Montana was built in 1905. It was listed on the National Register of Historic Places in 2004. The listing included the schoolhouse, a well house, two outhouses, and a playground.

The school is a large, rectangular, two-story white clapboard building, built to replace an original log cabin school. It was extended in 1916. It is located in the Howard Valley, on the south side of the Yellowstone River, about 11 miles (18 km) from Forsyth. The school building is visible from many miles away.
