= Heather Sharfeddin =

American novelist (born 1966)

- Born: Heather Lynne Mason; April 8, 1966 (age 59) Forsyth, Montana, U.S.
- Occupation: Novelist, teacher
- Education: Vermont College (MFA); Bath Spa University (PhD)
- Genre: Contemporary Western
- Spouse: Salem Sharfeddin (m. 1991)
- Children: 1

Website
- sharfeddin.com

Heather Sharfeddin (born April 8, 1966, Forsyth) is an American contemporary Western novelist. Her novels, including Blackbelly (2005) and Damaged Goods (2011), explore western themes based on her early life in Idaho and Montana.

== Early life and education ==
Sharfeddin was born in Forsyth, Montana to Joan and Lynn Mason, an artist and a forester with the U. S. Forest Service, respectively. The Masons moved to Riggins, Idaho when Heather was two and lived on the Salmon River. She and her two sisters were raised in the Pentecostal faith. They lived in Lucile, Idaho and spent two years in East Lansing, Michigan while their father completed a master's degree in forestry at Michigan State University. Sharfeddin graduated from Big Sky High School in Missoula in 1984. She moved to Portland, Oregon in 1986.

Later in her adult life, Sharfeddin earned an MFA in Writing from Vermont College of Fine Arts and a PhD in Creative Writing from Bath Spa University. Her doctoral work focused on racial tensions in the Interior West of the United States and culminated in a dissertation titled Interior Landscapes: Techniques for Depicting the Nuances of Interracial Relationships. This included a novel called A Delicate Divide, which takes place on the Flathead Indian Reservation and follows racial tensions in the wake of a water compact that would limit their "natural land water rights." Her dissertation was supervised by Kate Pullinger.

== Career ==
Sharfeddin's first novel, Blackbelly, was published in 2005 by Bridge Works Publishing. It is set in the fictional ranching community of Sweetwater, Idaho on the banks of the Salmon River. The imagery is heavily inspired by her childhood in that area. The novel follows a rancher who is falsely accused of committing a hate crime against the town's only Muslim family. The title refers to blackbelly sheep, which the protagonist and Sharfeddin both raise. The book was a "Best of the Northwest" pick by the Pacific Northwest Booksellers Association Award in 2005 and received honorable mentions for the 2005 Eric Hoffer Award and at the 2010 San Francisco Book Festival. Blackbelly was released in paperback in 2010 under the title Sweetwater Burning. Her second book, Mineral Spirits, was published the following year, also by Bridge Works Publishing. Set in remote Mineral County, Montana, the novel follows Sheriff Kip Edelson as he investigates a skeleton found along the Clark Fork River. Edelson was introduced briefly in Blackbelly.

In 2009, her third novel, Windless Summer, was published by Random House. The story follows single father Tom Jemmet, a motel owner in the fictional town of Rocket, Washington. A windless summer drives away the windsurfers who flock to the area every year, leaving the town struggling until Jemmet's motel makes the newspapers after guests begin experiencing "mysterious happenings." Sharfeddin's fourth novel, Damaged Goods, was published in 2011 by Random House and is set in rural western Oregon. It follows the relationship of an auctioneer recovering from a traumatic brain injury and a woman who has survived decades of abuse. In 2012, it was short-listed for the Spotted Owl Award for Best Pacific Northwest Mystery. Sharfeddin's fifth novel, What Keeps You, was released by Martin Brown Publishing in 2016. It follows 16-year-old Eva as she avoids certain death, and a group of souls trapped in a graveyard being dug up by a road crew.

Sharfeddin refers to her work as contemporary Western, which she defines as themes of the rural West set in the present day. She has been a regular book reviewer for Colorado Review and the Center for Literary Publishing, as well as a contributor to Dirt & Seeds, where she serialized her novel Between. In addition to writing, she has also taught at Randolph-Macon College, the University of Arkansas at Little Rock, and Linfield College. To mark the occasion of a book signing in Sharfeddin's hometown of Riggins, Idaho, mayor Bob Crump declared April 6, 2011 "Heather Mason Sharfeddin Day".

== Personal life ==
Sharfeddin married her husband in Oregon in the summer of 1991. Salem is a naturalized US citizen originally from Libya. The Sharfeddins lived on a farm in Sherwood, Oregon, where they raised blackbelly sheep, for 15 years before relocating to McMinnville, Oregon.

In 2012, Sharfeddin and her husband opened the Velvet Monkey Tea Shop in McMinnville. In 2018, she was appointed to a 3-year term on the Historic Landmarks Committee in McMinnville.

== Publications ==
- 2005: Blackbelly, Bridge Works. ISBN 978-1-882593-97-2
- 2006: Mineral Spirits, Bridge Works. ISBN 978-1-882593-98-9
- 2009: Windless Summer, Bentam/Delta. ISBN 978-0-385-34187-5
- 2010: Sweetwater Burning (paperback edition of Blackbelly), Bantam. ISBN 978-0-3853412-8-8
- 2011: Damaged Goods, Bantam. ISBN 978-0-385-34188-2
- 2016: What Keeps You, Martin Brown Publishing. ISBN 978-1-9370706-8-7
