= Claude O. Marcyes House =

Historic house in Montana, United States

- U.S. National Register of Historic Places
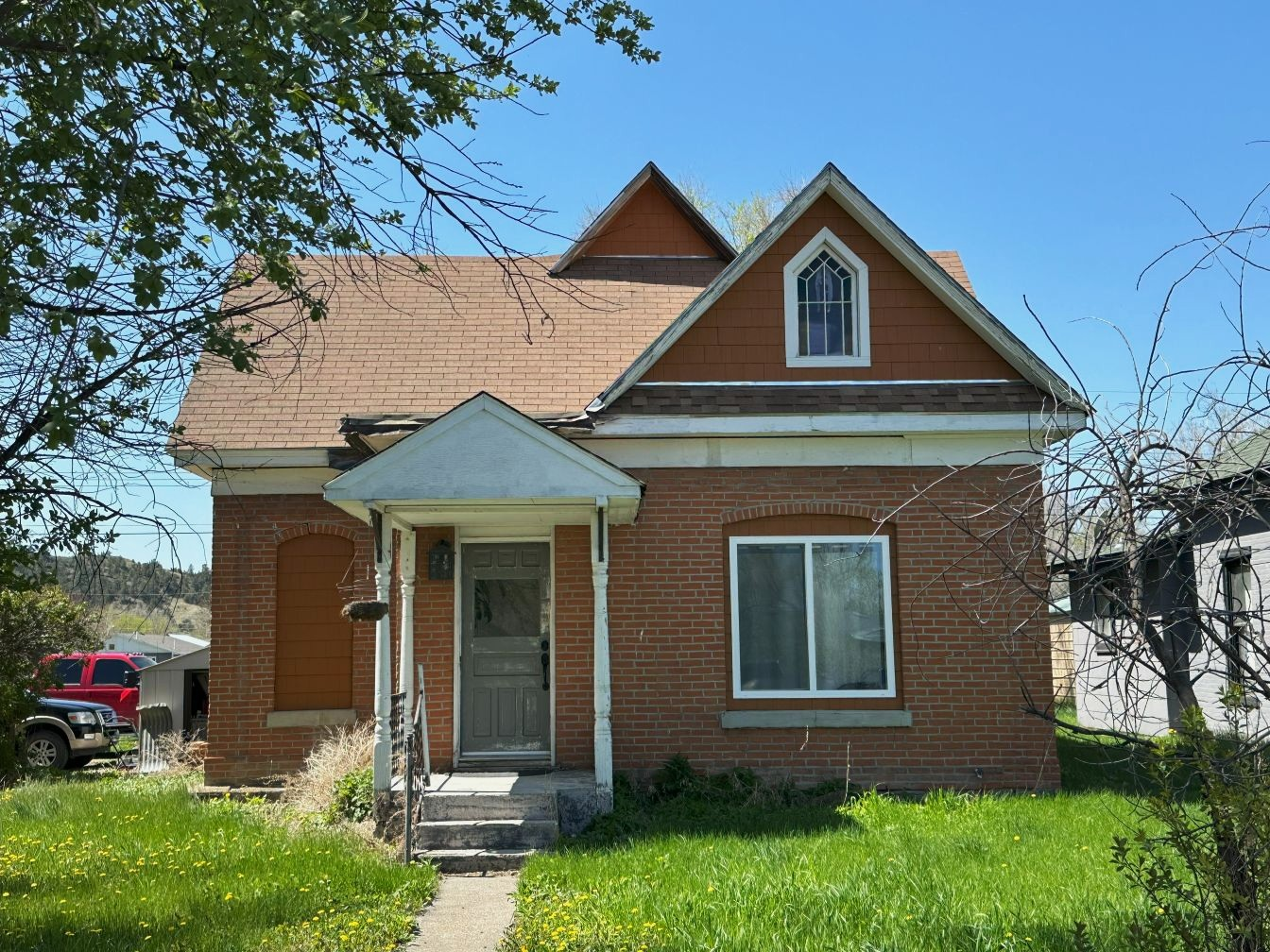

- Location within Montana
- Location: 390 S. 7th Ave. Forsyth, Montana
- Coordinates: 46°15′38″N 106°40′45″W
- Area: less than one acre
- Built: 1899
- Built by: Zeb Tart
- Architectural style: Queen Anne
- MPS: Forsyth MPS
- NRHP reference No.: 90000088
- Added to NRHP: February 12, 1990

The Claude O. Marcyes House, at 390 S. 7th Ave. in Forsyth, Montana, was built in 1899. It was listed on the National Register of Historic Places in 1990.

It is a one-and-a-half-story home which is asserted to have some elements of Queen Anne style. Zeb Tart, a stonemason and bricklayer, is believed to have done much of its construction. It was deemed "significant as an excellent surviving example of the Queen Anne building form in Forsyth, and is an unusually intact representative of early brick residential construction. It is also significant for its association with Hiram R. Marcyes, one of the two leading entrepreneurs and developers in pioneer Forsyth. This home is the best surviving example of a number of brick homes erected in Forsyth's southside under Marcyes' sponsorship."
