= Vananda, Montana =

Coordinates: 46°23′31″N 107°00′08″W

- Vananda Historic District
- U.S. National Register of Historic Places
- U.S. Historic district
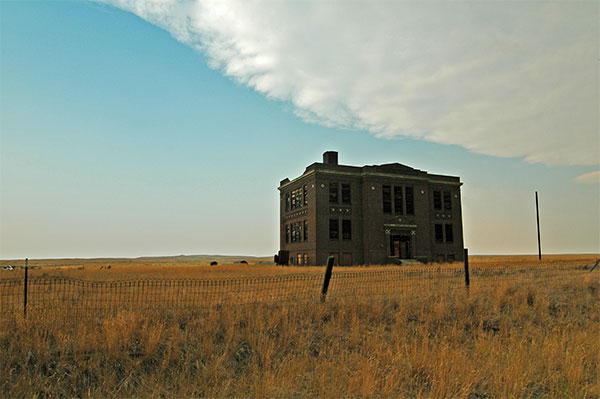
- Abandoned schoolhouse

- Location within Montana Location within the United States
- Nearest city: Forsyth, Montana
- Area: 32 acres (13 ha)
- Built: 1907
- Architect: Wahl, L.W.
- Architectural style: Classical Revival, Bungalow/craftsman
- NRHP reference No.: 90000629
- Added to NRHP: April 19, 1990

Vananda is a former unincorporated village in northwestern Rosebud County, Montana, United States, along the route of U.S. Highway 12.

== History ==
The town was established in 1908 as a station stop on the Chicago, Milwaukee, St. Paul and Pacific Railroad, then under construction across Montana. The railway used Vananda as a water stop for its steam locomotives, and built a small reservoir near the townsite to ensure an adequate water supply.

Although the land around Vananda attracted numerous homesteaders during the decade following the railroad's completion, the region proved to be far too arid and inhospitable for intensive agricultural use, and by the 1920s the town was in decline. The railroad through the area was abandoned in 1980, and Vananda is now a ghost town.

The Vananda townsite was listed on the National Register of Historic Places as the Vananda Historic District in 1990.

It included:

- Vananda School (1920), a two-story building
- Vananda State Bank (1917), a one-story 24 by 40 feet (7.3 m × 12.2 m) yellow- and red-brick building
- Berg Residence (c. 1920), a small one-story house
- Jacobsen Residence (c. 1921), a one-story bungalow house

among other buildings.
