= Battle of Wolf Mountain =

1877 battle of the American Indian Wars

- Part of the Great Sioux War of 1876
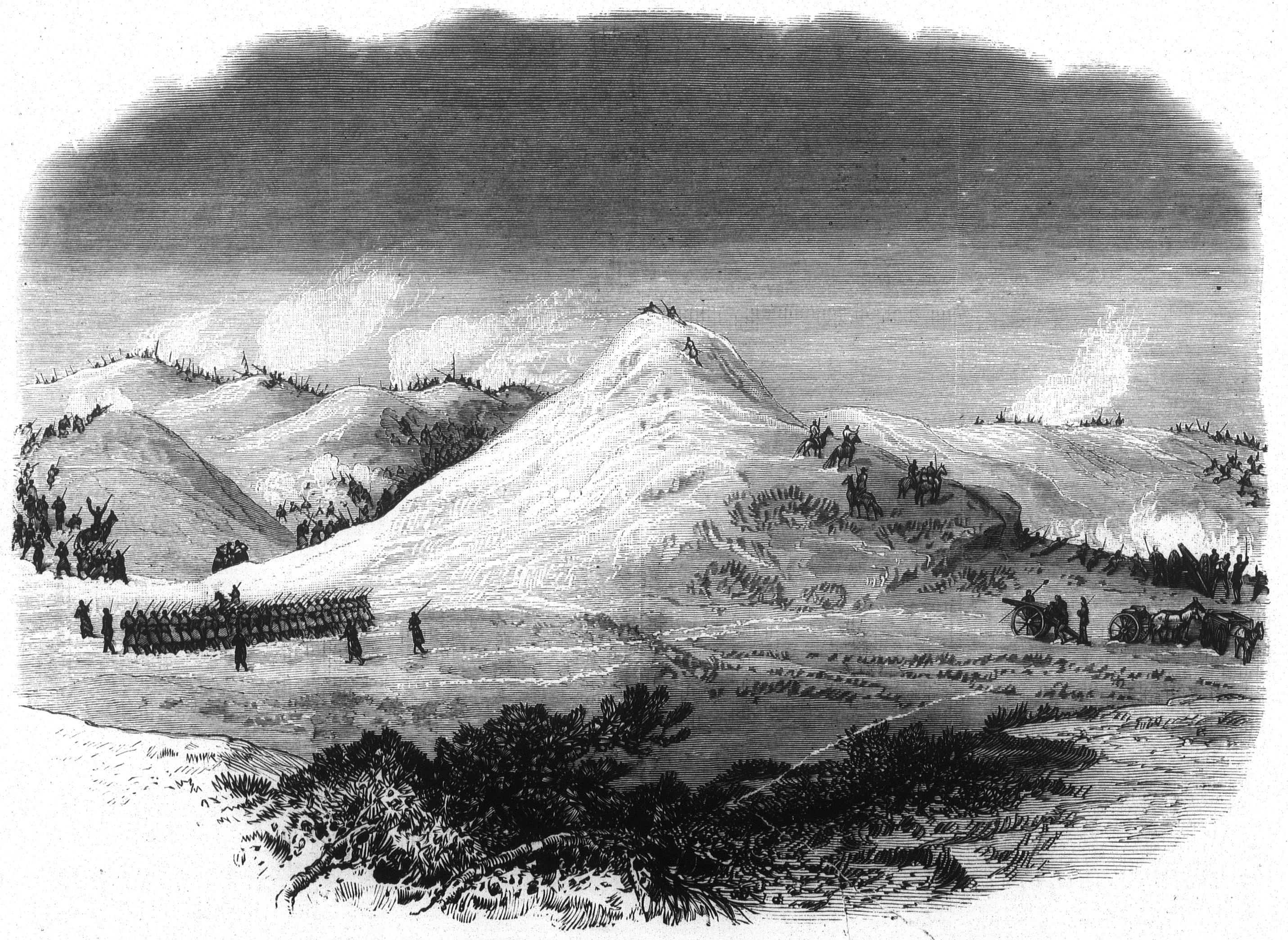
- A photoprint of an illustration of the Battle of Wolf Mountain that appeared in the May 5, 1877 edition of Frank Leslie's Illustrated Newspaper
Date	January 8, 1877
Location	Tongue River Valley, Montana Territory (near present-day Birney, Montana); 45°17.152′N 106°34.836′W
Result	American victory

Belligerents
United States	Sioux; Cheyenne

Commanders and leaders
(United States) Nelson A. Miles	Crazy Horse; Two Moon

Strength
436	~500

Casualties and losses
3 killed 8 wounded	3 killed Unknown wounded

The Battle of Wolf Mountain (also known as the Battle of the Wolf Mountains, Miles's Battle on the Tongue River, the Battle of the Butte, Where Big Crow Walked Back and Forth, and called the Battle of Belly Butte by the Northern Cheyenne) was fought on January 8, 1877, by soldiers of the United States Army against Lakota Sioux and Northern Cheyenne warriors during the Great Sioux War of 1876. The battle was fought in southern Montana Territory, about four miles southwest of modern-day Birney, Montana, along the Tongue River.

In 2001, the Wolf Mountains Battlefield was listed on the National Register of Historic Places, and was raised to the status of National Historic Landmark in 2008.

== Background ==
Following the defeat of Lieutenant Colonel George A. Custer on June 25, 1876, in the Battle of Little Bighorn, the United States government sent a large number of reinforcements into Montana Territory. By autumn, a few bands of the Sioux and Cheyenne tribes had begun returning to the reservations and agencies to acquire food and annuity goods in preparation for winter. The United States Congress had angered many Indians by demanding that they cede the Black Hills to the government in exchange for these promised goods. The army had replaced civilian contractors in charge of the agencies, further convincing many war bands to stay away from them. General Nelson Miles led a mixed force of infantry, artillery and cavalry after Sitting Bull's band, and had effectively defeated them by December. Ranald S. Mackenzie had similarly defeated Dull Knife's Cheyennes, who trekked through snow and icy conditions to join the camp of Crazy Horse in the Tongue River Valley. Concerned with the approaching winter and the destitute condition of Dull Knife's band, Crazy Horse decided to negotiate peace with the army. However, when a group of United States Army Crow scouts murdered Crazy Horse's delegation, the war chief demanded revenge. He led a series of small raids in an effort to draw out Colonel Miles from Tongue River Cantonment. In December, 1876, Colonel Miles led most of nine Infantry companies out of the Cantonment in pursuit of Crazy Horse, marching south, up the Tongue River valley. On January 7, 1877, Miles captured a few Northern Cheyennes, then his force of 436 men camped along the Tongue just south of present-day Birney, Montana. During that night a fresh layer of deep snow fell and temperatures dropped.

== Battle ==
After shots were fired in the early morning hours, Miles set up a defensive perimeter along a ridge line that's most prominent feature was a small conical shaped knoll later called Battle Butte, positioning two pieces of artillery beside it, in front of a clear field of fire. At 7:00 a.m., Crazy Horse and Two Moon began a series of attacks on the soldiers. Frustrated by army firepower, the warriors regrouped several times to begin attacking again. Attempts to flank Miles' line also proved to be futile when Miles shifted his reserves to fill critical positions. Finally, Miles ordered several 5th Infantry companies to advance to a series of hills occupied by warriors. Miles' soldiers struggled in taking the hills, the matter being further complicated with deep snow. After soldiers secured seven of the hills the Sioux and Cheyenne withdrew as weather conditions deteriorated, leaving the field with a tactical draw.

== Aftermath ==
Although a draw in many aspects, in effect the battle was a strategic victory for the U.S. Army, as it demonstrated that the Sioux and Cheyenne were not safe from the army even during the winter in harsh conditions. Many individuals began slipping away and returning to their reservations. By May, Crazy Horse had led his surviving band into Camp Robinson to surrender.

== Order of battle ==
United States Army, (Colonel Nelson A. Miles, commanding)

- 5th U.S. Infantry Regiment
  - Company A.
  - Company C.
  - Company D.
  - Company E.
  - Company K.
  - Company B detachment.
  - Company H detachment.
- 22nd U.S. Infantry Regiment: Lieutenant Colonel Elwell S. Otis
  - Company E.
  - Company F.

Native Americans, Lakota Sioux and Northern Cheyenne. (Crazy Horse and Two Moon)

- Approximately 500 warriors.
