= Herman and Hannah Anderson House =

Historic house in Montana, United States

- U.S. National Register of Historic Places
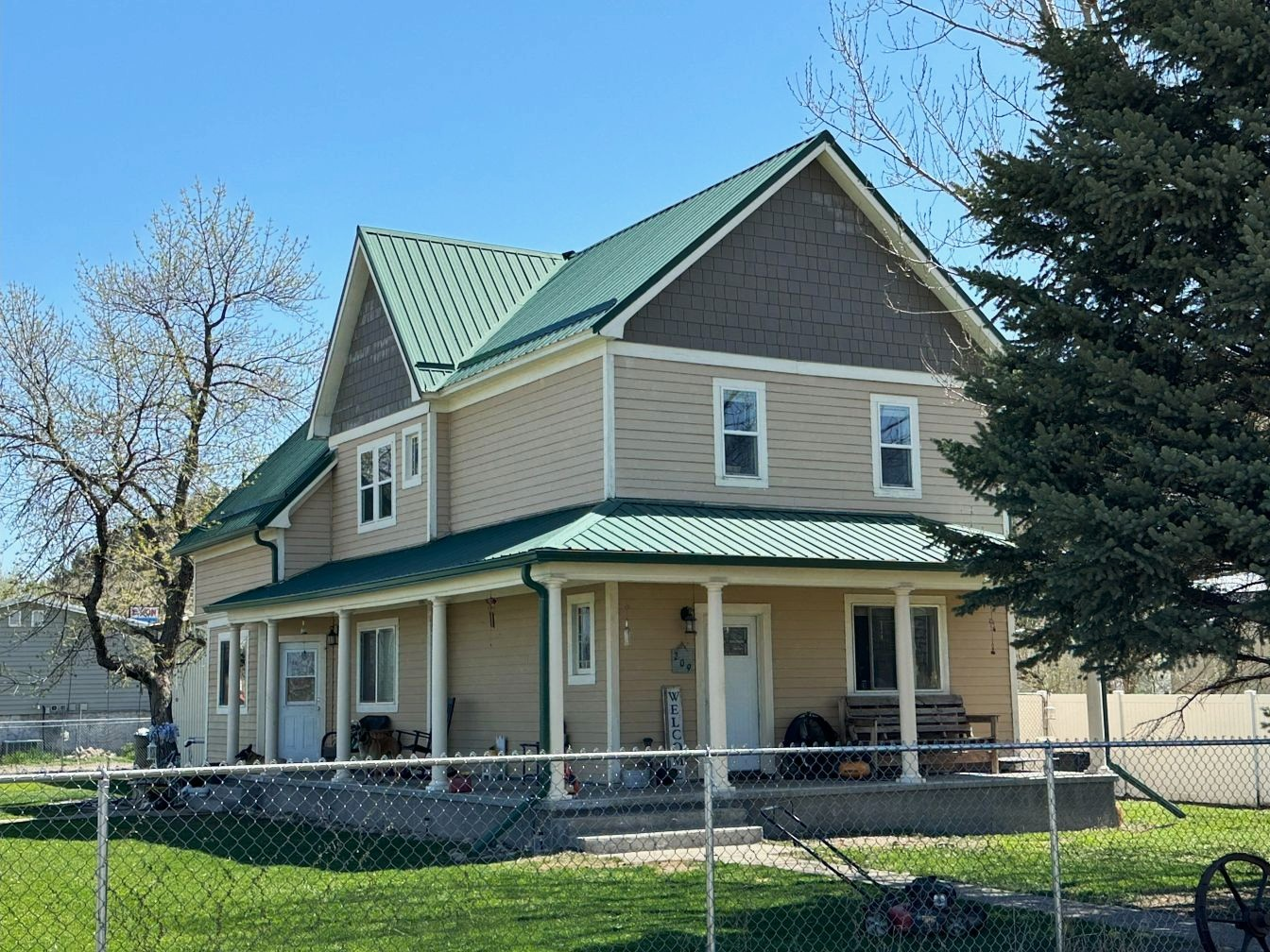
- The houses in 2025

- Location within Montana Location within the United States
- Location: 209 S. 7th Ave. Forsyth, Montana
- Coordinates: 46°15′43″N 106°40′48″W
- Area: less than one acre
- Built: 1908
- Built by: Wadell, J.W.
- Architectural style: Colonial Revival, Queen Anne
- MPS: Forsyth MPS
- NRHP reference No.: 90000084
- Added to NRHP: February 12, 1990

The Herman and Hannah Anderson House in Forsyth, Montana was built in 1908. It was listed on the National Register of Historic Places in 1990.

It is a two-story wood-framed house on a concrete foundation with a cross-gable roof. It has a one-and-a-half-story gabled addition from before 1910. It has shiplap siding, and Queen Anne/Colonial Revival details.

The NRHP nomination asserts it "is significant as an excellent surviving example of a larger early twentieth-century Forsyth residence", somewhat unusual for its location on the southside near the railroad, while other larger homes in Forsyth were in its primary residential area across the tracks. It was in fact located within 100 yards (91 m) of the 16-stall roundhouse of the Northern Pacific Railroad. Herman Anderson, who emigrated from Sweden in 1889, worked for the railroad.
