= Blue Front Rooming House =

- U.S. National Register of Historic Places
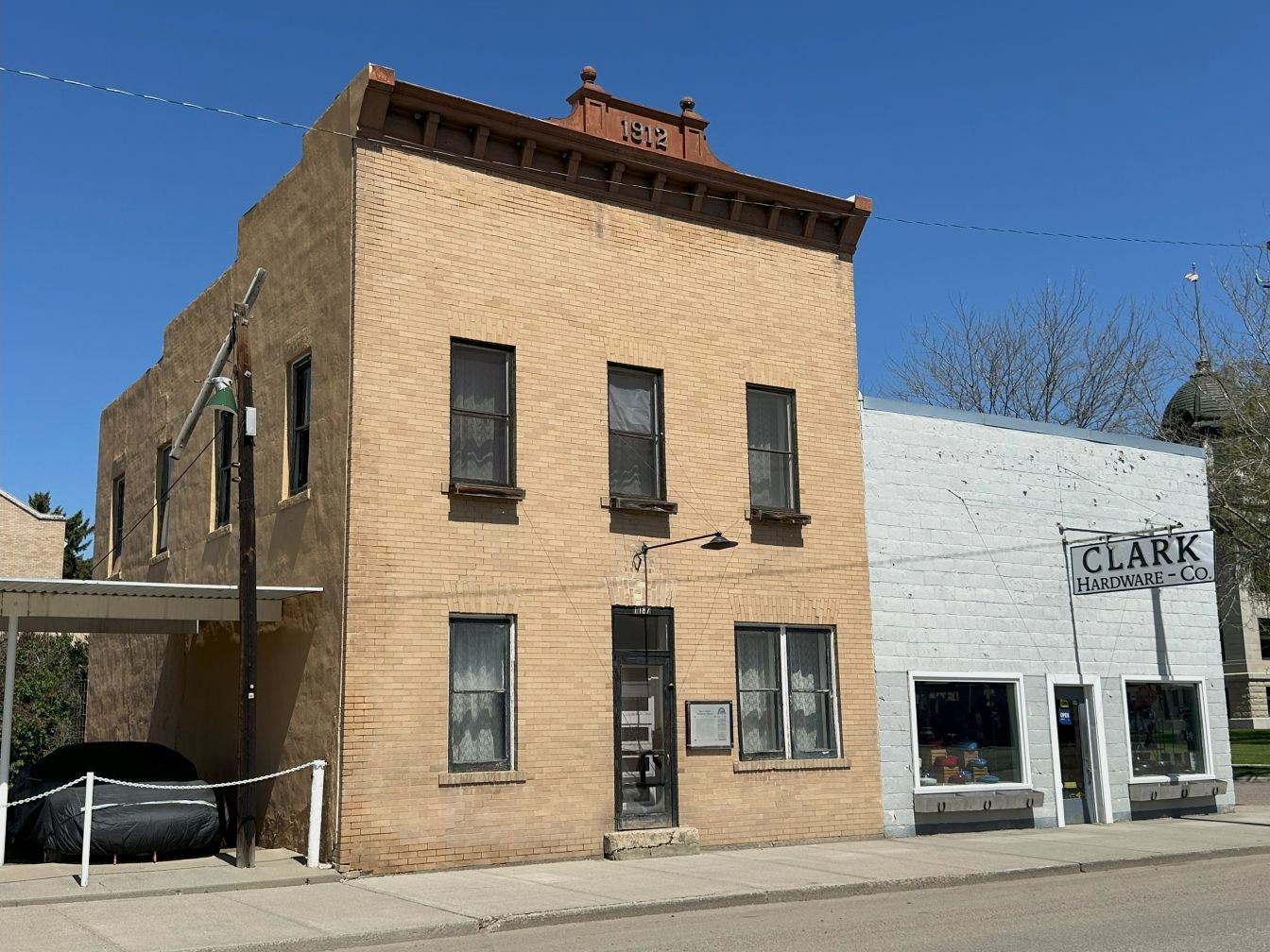
- The building in 2025

- Location within Montana
- Location: 1187 Main St. Forsyth, Montana
- Coordinates: 46°16′02″N 106°40′32″W
- Area: less than one acre
- Built: 1912
- Architectural style: Italianate
- MPS: Forsyth MPS
- NRHP reference No.: 90000085
- Added to NRHP: February 12, 1990

The Blue Front Rooming House, at 1187 Main St. in Forsyth, Montana, was built in 1912. It was listed on the National Register of Historic Places in 1990.

It has also been known as the Swanland Hotel. It was deemed "significant as an excellent surviving example of an early twentieth-century residential lodging facility."

It is a two-story brick 25 by 40 feet (7.6 m × 12.2 m) commercial building. Its facade is faced with light-colored commercial brick; the sides are red brick, probably locally produced.
