= Brotherhood of Locomotive Engineers Hall =

- U.S. National Register of Historic Places
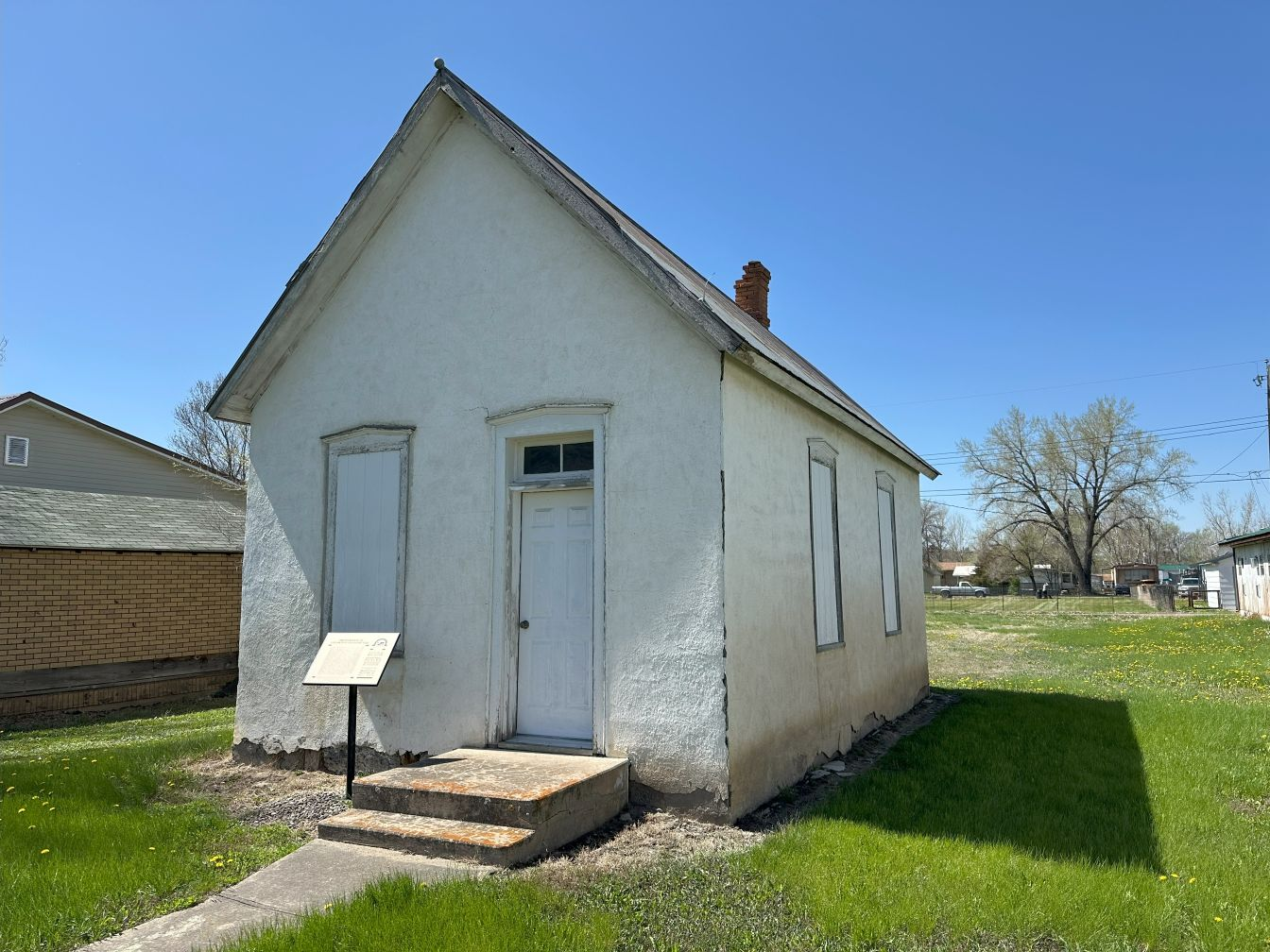
- The building in 2025

- Location within Montana Location within the United States
- Location: 262 S. 7th Ave. Forsyth, Montana
- Coordinates: 46°15′42″N 106°40′49″W
- Area: Less than one acre
- Built: 1895
- Architectural style: Gable front
- MPS: Forsyth MPS
- NRHP reference No.: 90000086
- Added to NRHP: February 12, 1990

The Brotherhood of Locomotive Engineers Hall at 262 S. 7th Ave. in Forsyth, Montana, United States, was built in 1895. It was listed on the National Register of Historic Places in 1990. It has also been known as the B of L E Hall.

It was deemed "significant as the long-time meeting hall for the Forsyth local of the Brotherhood of Locomotive Engineers (BLE). As a railroad community, Forsyth's labor unions played an often-important social role in the town. Architecturally, the building is the finest surviving local example of the numerous small, rectangular, end-gable buildings that were very common in late nineteenth-century Forsyth."
