= First Presbyterian Church and Manse (Forsyth, Montana) =

Historic church in Montana, United States

- U.S. National Register of Historic Places
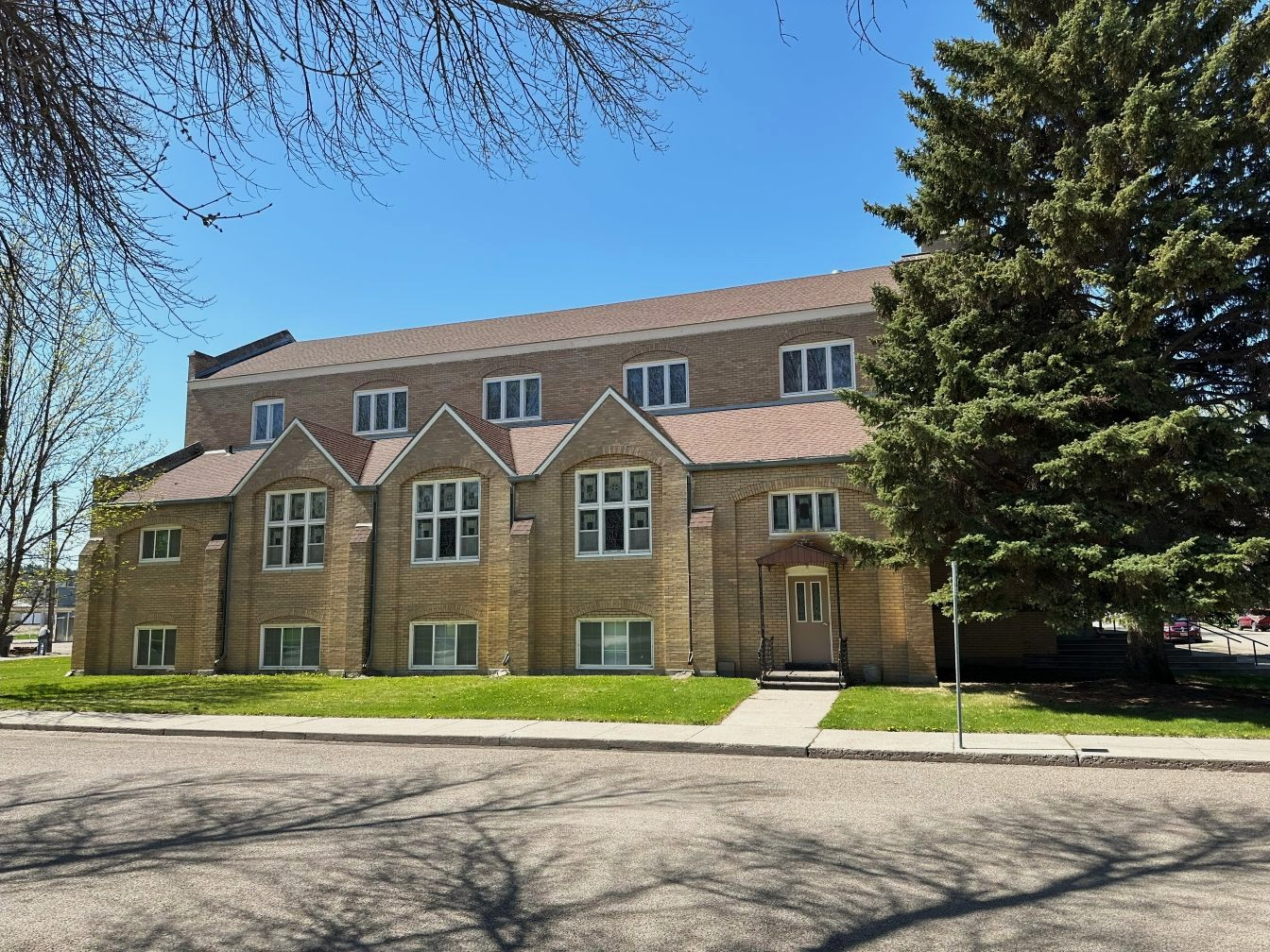
- Side elevation of the church

- Location within Montana Location within the United States
- Location: 1160-1180 Cedar St. Forsyth, Montana
- Coordinates: 46°16′3″N 106°40′32″W
- Area: less than one acre
- Built: 1920 (church), 1910 (manse)
- Architect: Howard Van Doren Shaw
- Architectural style: Prairie School
- MPS: Forsyth MPS
- NRHP reference No.: 90000089
- Added to NRHP: February 12, 1990

First Presbyterian Church and Manse is a historic Presbyterian church building and parsonage at 1160–1180 Cedar Street in Forsyth, Montana. The property was listed on the National Register of Historic Places in 1990.

The church building was designed by architect Howard Van Doren Shaw in Prairie School style and was constructed in 1920. It has also been known as Federated Church. The manse was built in 1910 and is a second contributing building on the property. A 1940-ish garage was deemed non-contributing.
