= Bascom, Montana =

- Unincorporated community
- Location within Montana Location within the United States
- Coordinates: 46°37′34″N 107°45′12″W
- Country: United States
- State: Montana
- County: Rosebud
- Elevation: 2,936 ft (895 m)
- Time zone: UTC-7 (Mountain (MST))
  - Summer (DST): UTC-6 (MDT)
- Area code: 406
- GNIS feature ID: 768537

Bascom is an unincorporated community in Rosebud County, Montana, United States.
