= St. Labre Indian Catholic High School =

School in Ashland, Montana, US

Location
- 112 St. Labre Campus Road; Ashland, (Rosebud County), Montana 59004; United States; 45°36′16″N 106°16′49″W

Information
- Type: Private, Coeducational
- Religious affiliation: Roman Catholic
- Established: 1884
- Executive Director: Curtis Yarlott
- Grades: 9–12
- Colors: Purple and Gold
- Sports: Basketball, Volleyball, Football, Track & Field, Cross Country
- Team name: Braves and Lady Braves
- Rival: Lodge Grass Indians, Lamedeer Morning Stars
- Website: http://www.stlabre.org

St. Labre Indian Catholic High School is a private, Roman Catholic high school in Ashland, Montana. It is located within the Roman Catholic Diocese of Great Falls-Billings and serves students from Crow and Northern Cheyenne tribes.

== Background ==
The founding of St. Labre Indian School in 1884 was one of the first efforts to care for Native Americans who had been displaced as a result of homesteading. George Yoakum, a former soldier who had been stationed near Miles City, Montana, recognized the hard times experienced by the Northern Cheyenne. He contacted John Brondel, Bishop of Helena, and told him of Native American people who were roaming the Tongue River Valley without homes or land—a reservation had not yet been set aside as their land. Land was purchased by the Bishop, and on March 29, 1884, St. Labre Indian School, named for St. Benedict Joseph Labre, became a reality.

The school is located in Ashland, Montana, a primarily white community which did not exist at the time of the founding of the school. Ashland has a K to 8th grade school serving its residents available to the students at St. Labre School. St. Labre offers a Catholic education as well as a curriculum similar to other Rosebud County schools. St. Labre also has a high school while the public school ends at eighth grade. Ashland Elementary students often continue their education at Colstrip High which is an hour commute.

== Controversy ==
The school has an unrated profile on Charity Navigator and has found itself the subject of litigation (brought against it by the Northern Cheyenne Tribe). The Northern Cheyenne Tribe questions the school's use of millions of dollars while in service to a limited number of actual tribe members. The Tribal Council settled litigation with St. Labre School for payments totaling $11 million by 2019 plus $60,000 annually thereafter, which members of the tribe have claimed the Tribal Council misappropriated. There have been demonstrations and protests by Northern Cheyenne Tribe members against its Tribal Council.
