= Forsyth Residential Historic District =

Historic district in Montana, United States

- U.S. National Register of Historic Places
- U.S. Historic district
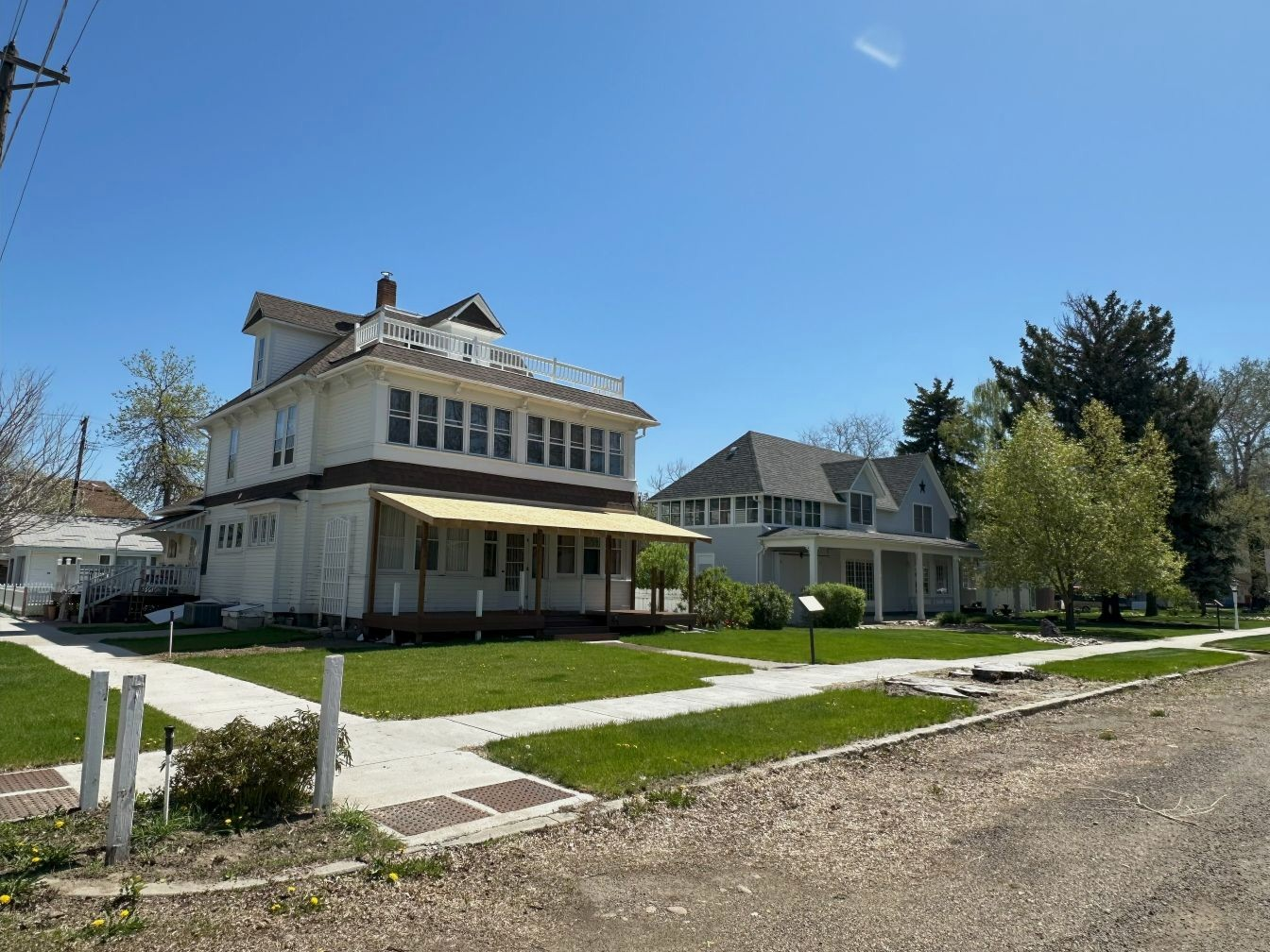

- Location within Montana Location within the United States
- Location: Roughly bounded by Cedar St., 11th Ave., Willow St., 12th Ave., Oak St., and 14th Ave., Forsyth, Montana
- Coordinates: 46°16′11″N 106°40′35″W
- Area: 21 acres (8.5 ha)
- Built: 1890
- Architectural style: Colonial Revival, Bungalow/craftsman, Queen Anne
- MPS: Forsyth MPS
- NRHP reference No.: 90000082
- Added to NRHP: February 12, 1990

The Forsyth Residential Historic District, in Forsyth, Montana, is a 21 acres (8.5 ha) historic district which was listed on the National Register of Historic Places in 1990.

The district included 107 contributing buildings and is roughly bounded by Cedar St., 11th Ave., Willow St., 12th Ave., Oak St., and 14th Ave.

It includes examples of Colonial Revival, Bungalow/craftsman, and Queen Anne architecture.

Its NRHP nomination asserts:

The district comprises a cohesive residential neighborhood containing a relatively high level of integrity and possessing many of Forsyth's finest residential buildings. The area's quiet, inviting avenues host a diverse grouping of late 19th and early 20th century homes, displaying an accurate visual chronology of the evolution of Forsyth's residential building forms.
