= St. Philip's Episcopal Church (Rosebud, Montana) =

- U.S. National Register of Historic Places
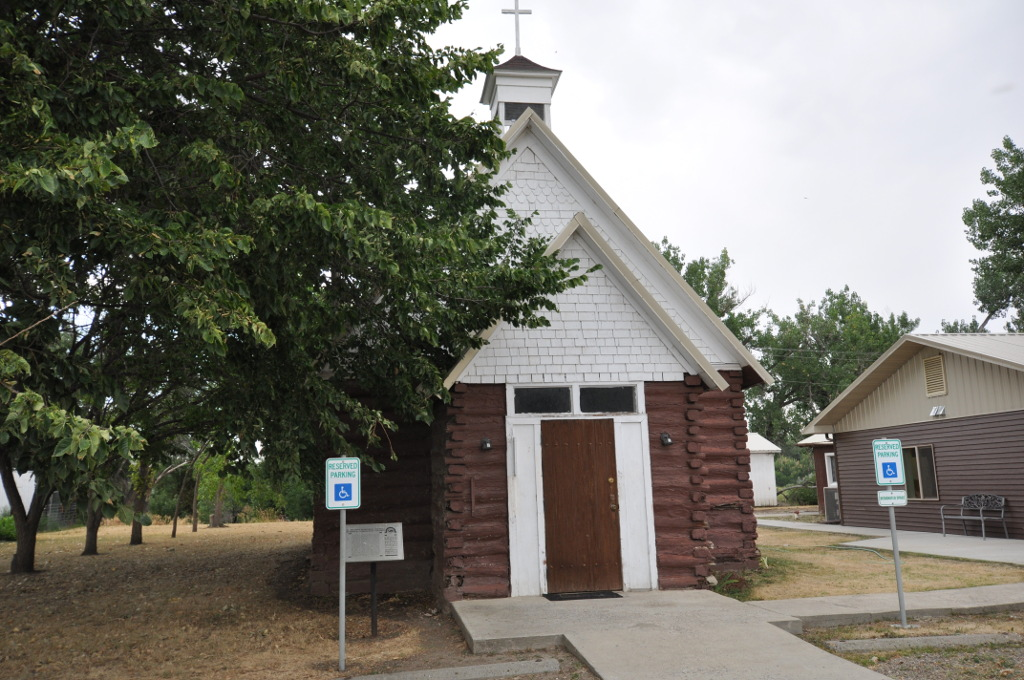

- Location within Montana
- Location: 701 Main St., Rosebud, Montana
- Coordinates: 46°16′33″N 106°26′24″W
- Area: less than one acre
- Built: 1906
- Built by: Mefford, Fred L.; Drescher, Al
- Architectural style: Gable-front with vestuble
- NRHP reference No.: 07001232
- Added to NRHP: November 20, 2007

The St. Philip's Episcopal Church, at 701 Main St. in Rosebud, Montana, was built in 1906. It was listed on the National Register of Historic Places in 2007. It has also been known as the Rosebud Community Church and as the Little Log Church. It is located geographically in the Episcopal Diocese of Montana.

It is a gable-front log building with a vestibule. It was built by carpenters Fred L. Mefford and Al Drescher. It is a relatively rare surviving example of work by Al Drescher, who built much of Rosebud. Drescher immigrated to the U.S. from Germany in 1888, at age 23. The church is unusual among Drescher's work as a log structure rather than a frame structure.
