= Heil, North Dakota =

- Census-designated place
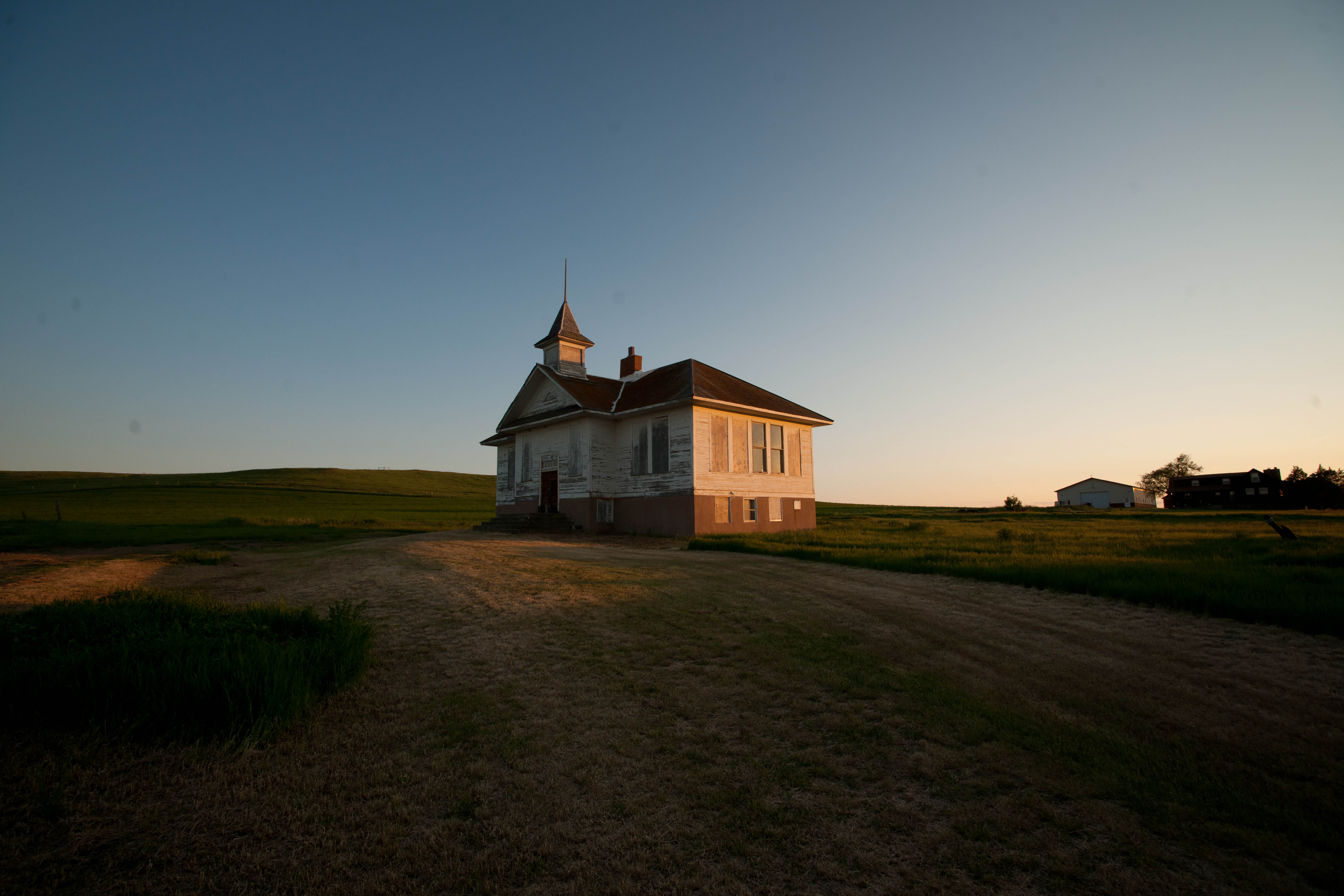
- Building in Heil

- Location within North Dakota Location within the United States
- Coordinates: 46°23′21″N 101°42′04″W
- Country: United States
- State: North Dakota
- County: Grant

Area
  - Total: 0.20 sq mi (0.52 km^{2})
  - Land: 0.20 sq mi (0.52 km^{2})
  - Water: 0 sq mi (0.00 km^{2})
- Elevation: 2,303 ft (702 m)

Population (2020)
  - Total: 15
  - Density: 75/sq mi (28.9/km^{2})
- Time zone: UTC-7 (Mountain (MST))
  - Summer (DST): UTC-6 (MDT)
- Area code: 701
- GNIS feature ID: 2584346

Heil is a census-designated place and unincorporated community in Grant County, North Dakota, United States. As of the 2020 census, Heil had a population of 15. Heil was initially named "Lawther" for founder William Lawther; after William Heil bought the community from Lawther, it was renamed to "Heil".

== Demographics ==
Historical population
Census	Pop.	Note	%±
2020	15		—
U.S. Decennial Census
