= Lame Deer, Montana =

Lame Deer, Montana Mo'ȯhtávȯheomeneno
- CDP
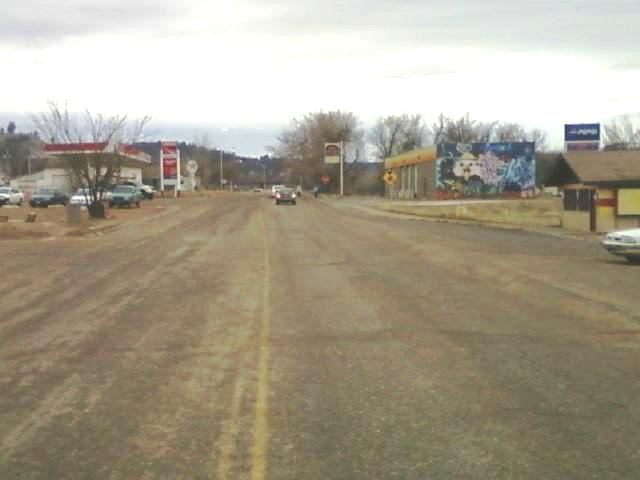
- Looking south on Cheyenne Ave near the center of town.

- Location of Lame Deer, Montana
- Coordinates: 45°37′23″N 106°40′01″W
- Country: United States
- State: Montana
- County: Rosebud

Area
  - Total: 55.59 sq mi (143.99 km^{2})
  - Land: 55.59 sq mi (143.99 km^{2})
  - Water: 0 sq mi (0.00 km^{2})
- Elevation: 3,865 ft (1,178 m)

Population (2020)
  - Total: 1,897
  - Density: 34.1/sq mi (13.17/km^{2})
- Time zone: UTC-7 (Mountain (MST))
  - Summer (DST): UTC-6 (MDT)
- Postal code: 59043
- Area code: 406
- FIPS code: 30-42250
- GNIS feature ID: 2408567

Lame Deer (Cheyenne: Mo'ȯhtávȯheomeneno) is a census-designated place (CDP) in Rosebud County, Montana, United States. The community is named after Miniconjou Lakota chief Lame Deer, who was killed by the U.S. Army in 1877 under a flag of truce south of the town. It was the site of a trading post from the late 1870s. As of the 2020 census, Lame Deer had a population of 1,897.

It is the tribal and government agency headquarters of the Northern Cheyenne Indian Reservation. This is the location of the Chief Dull Knife College and the annual Northern Cheyenne Powwow.

== Geography ==
According to the United States Census Bureau, the CDP has a total area of 55.6 square miles (144 km^{2}), all land.

=== Climate ===
According to the Köppen Climate Classification system, Lame Deer has a semi-arid climate, abbreviated "BSk" on climate maps.

== Demographics ==
Historical population
Census	Pop.	Note	%±
2020	1,897		—
U.S. Decennial Census

=== 2020 census ===
As of the 2020 census, Lame Deer had a population of 1,897. The median age was 26.5 years. 37.5% of residents were under the age of 18 and 9.3% of residents were 65 years of age or older. For every 100 females there were 102.7 males, and for every 100 females age 18 and over there were 96.0 males age 18 and over.

0.0% of residents lived in urban areas, while 100.0% lived in rural areas.

There were 497 households in Lame Deer, of which 48.1% had children under the age of 18 living in them. Of all households, 30.0% were married-couple households, 25.2% were households with a male householder and no spouse or partner present, and 38.4% were households with a female householder and no spouse or partner present. About 24.4% of all households were made up of individuals and 7.8% had someone living alone who was 65 years of age or older.

There were 560 housing units, of which 11.2% were vacant. The homeowner vacancy rate was 0.4% and the rental vacancy rate was 5.9%.

Racial composition as of the 2020 census
Race	Number	Percent
White	62	3.3%
Black or African American	0	0.0%
American Indian and Alaska Native	1,776	93.6%
Asian	1	0.1%
Native Hawaiian and Other Pacific Islander	0	0.0%
Some other race	2	0.1%
Two or more races	56	3.0%
Hispanic or Latino (of any race)	28	1.5%

=== 2010 census ===
As of the 2010 census, there were 2,052 people, 521 households, and 401 families residing in the CDP. The population density was 36.3 inhabitants per square mile (14.0/km^{2}). There are a total of 613 housing units, which makes at an average density of 10.3 per square mile (4.0/km^{2}). The racial makeup was 93.7% Native American, 4.3% White, 0.03% African American, 0.01% Asian, 0.2% from other races, and 1.4% from two or more races. Hispanic or Latino of any race were 3.4% of the population.

Of the 521 households, 40.9% had children under the age of 18 living with them, 36.5% were married couples living together, 26.9% had a female householder with no husband present, and 23.0% were non-families. 19.4% of the households had someone living alone who was 65 years of age or older. The average household size was 3.90 and the average family size was 4.53.

The population was spread out, with 43.7% under the age of 18, 55.1% 21 or older and 5.6% who were 65 years of age or older. The median age was 23.9 years. For every 100 females there were 93.7 males. For every 100 females age 18 and over, there were 95.2 males.

=== Income and poverty ===
The median household income was $28,700 and the median income for a family was $32,039; 43.1% of the population were below the poverty line, including 45.8% of those under the age of 18 and 46.9% of those 65 and older.

=== 2000 census ===
Languages (2000)	Percent
Spoke English at home	67.87%
Spoke Cheyenne at home	28.88%
Spoke Crow at home	2.70%
Spoke Dakota at home	0.54%

== Education and culture ==
The Northern Cheyenne Arts and Crafts Center, Charging Horse Casino and Cafe, and Lame Deer Museum are located here.

Chief Dull Knife College is a Native American tribal community college and land grant institution located in Lame Deer.

The main office of the National Indigenous Women's Resource Center, which works to prevent family violence, is located in Lame Deer.

The Lame Deer High School Morningstars play in the 3B conference with the Baker Spartans, Colstrip Colts, Forsyth Dogies, St. Labre Braves, and Broadus Hawks.

== Media ==
The Forsyth-based Independent Press covers news for all of Rosebud County, which includes Lame Deer.
