= J.A. Bookman General Store =

- J. A. Bookman General Store
- U.S. National Register of Historic Places
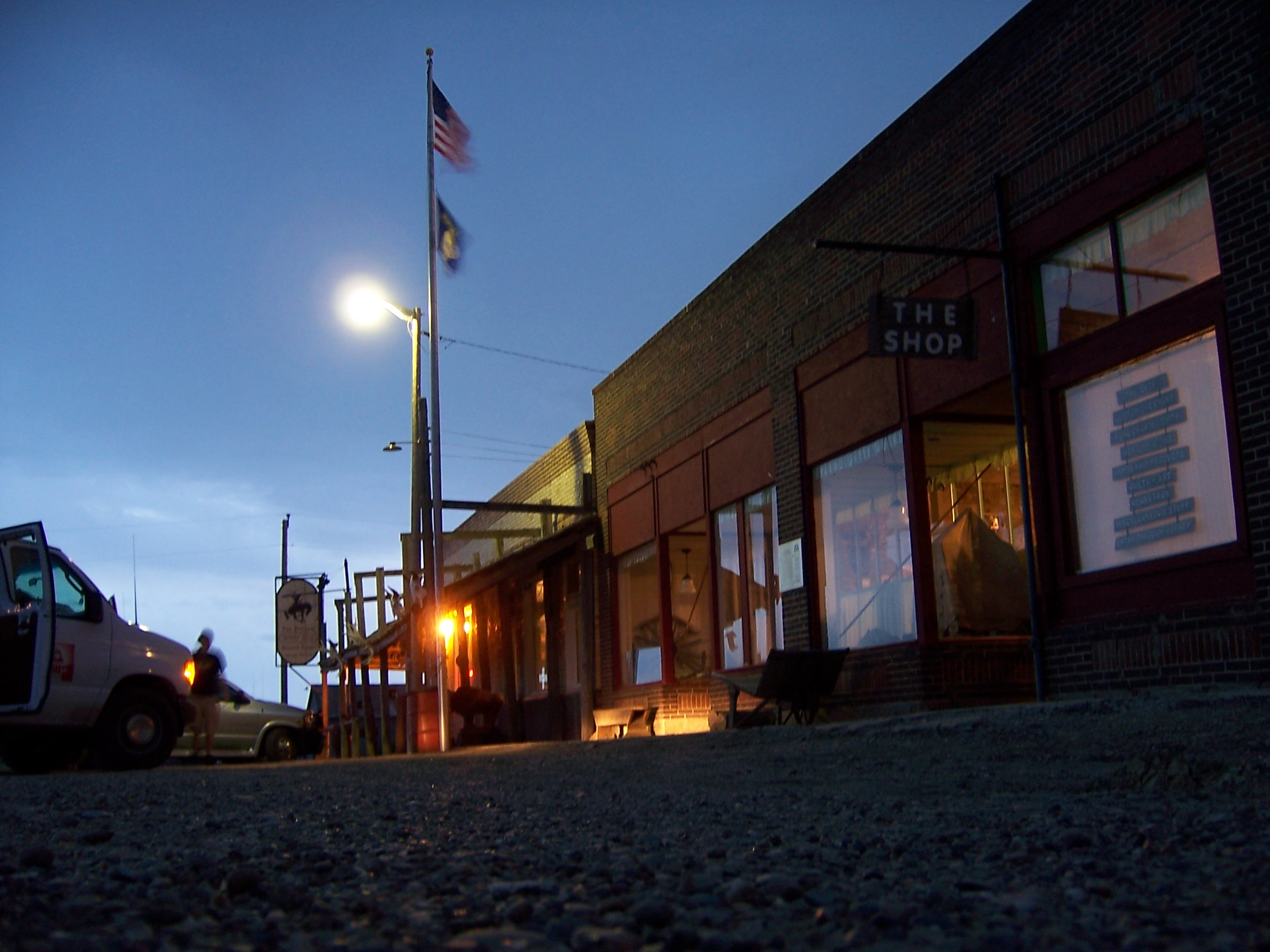

- Location within Montana Location within the United States
- Location: Main St., Ingomar, Montana
- Coordinates: 46°34′39″N 107°22′24″W
- Area: less than one acre
- Built: 1921
- Architectural style: Western Commercial
- NRHP reference No.: 94001067
- Added to NRHP: September 2, 1994

The J.A. Bookman General Store, on Main Street in Ingomar, Montana, was built in 1921. It was listed on the National Register of Historic Places in 1994.

It was one of only two surviving brick buildings in Ingomar. It has two single-bay commercial storefronts, topped by a parapet wall.

It was deemed

historically significant for its association with early twentieth-century patterns of trade and commerce in Ingomar and Rosebud County. As with most small towns in eastern Montana, Ingomar existed primarily as a retail trade center for farm and ranch settlers in the immediate vicinity. The town's small business district was a focal of retail (and, consequently, social) activity for both the community and the surrounding countryside. The Bookman Store was, in turn, a primary element in Ingomar's business life. For nearly thirty years, J.A. Bookman General Store was the largest mercantile in Ingomar, and a centerpiece of the town's commercial district. The store's importance and prosperity is attested to by the building's relatively large size, substantial construction, and prominent location.
