= Rosebud, Montana =

Unincorporated community and census-designated place in Montana, United States

Rosebud
- unincorporated community & census-designated place
- Interactive map of Rosebud
- Coordinates: 46°16′16″N 106°26′49″W
- Country: United States
- State: Montana
- County: Rosebud County

Area
  - Total: 0.77 sq mi (2.00 km^{2})
  - Land: 0.76 sq mi (1.98 km^{2})
  - Water: 0.0077 sq mi (0.02 km^{2})
- Elevation: 2,533 ft (772 m)

Population (2020)
  - Total: 67
  - Density: 87.7/sq mi (33.85/km^{2})
- Postal code: 59347
- Area code: 406
- FIPS code: 30-64375
- GNIS feature ID: 2583840
- Website: http://www.rosebudmontana.com

Rosebud is an unincorporated community, census-designated place and river town in Rosebud County, Montana, United States. As of the 2020 census, Rosebud had a population of 67. It is located approximately 1.5 miles east of the intersection of the Yellowstone River and Rosebud Creek. Interstate 94 passes south of the town.

In 1878, Rosebud began as a small post office referred to as Beeman, on the Fort Keogh–Bozeman Stage Line. In 1882 the Northern Pacific Railroad and named the town Rosebud.

The Rosebud High School is the highest level of education offered for the town. Enrollment is 31 with a student teacher ratio of 4:1. The team name is the Wranglers.

== Media ==
The Forsyth-based Independent Press covers news for all of Rosebud County, which includes Rosebud.

Historical population
Census	Pop.	Note	%±
2020	67		—
U.S. Decennial Census
