= Birney, Montana =

Birney, Montana Oévemanȧhéno
- Census-designated place
- Location of Birney, Montana
- Coordinates: 45°23′34″N 106°30′14″W
- Country: United States
- State: Montana
- County: Rosebud

Area
  - Total: 15.09 sq mi (39.07 km^{2})
  - Land: 15.09 sq mi (39.07 km^{2})
  - Water: 0 sq mi (0.00 km^{2})
- Elevation: 3,222 ft (982 m)

Population (2020)
  - Total: 97
  - Density: 6.4/sq mi (2.48/km^{2})
- Time zone: UTC-7 (Mountain (MST))
  - Summer (DST): UTC-6 (MDT)
- ZIP code: 59012
- Area code: 406
- FIPS code: 30-06925
- GNIS feature ID: 2407851

Birney (Cheyenne: Oévemanȧhéno) is a census-designated place (CDP) in Rosebud County, Montana, United States. The population was 97 at the 2020 census.

The post office was established in 1886.

== History ==
The nearby town of Ashland was called Birney, the name of the postmaster, from 1881 to 1886. The current town of Birney was named for a fur trader.

The Battle of Wolf Mountain was fought near present-day Birney in January 1877. The battle was part of the Great Sioux War of 1876.

The OW Ranch is nearby. It is one of the largest and oldest ranches in the area. It began operation in 1885. By 1900 John B. Kendrick purchased the ranch. It was listed on the National Register of Historic Places in 1992.

In the late 1950s, the town consisted of a one-room schoolhouse (of two classrooms), a small church, the Birney Cash Store and its post office, the store called Ranch Stores, and six households with a population of 13.

== Geography ==
Birney is located on the Tongue River Road, near the confluence of the Tongue River and Hanging Woman Creek. It is approximately 40 miles (64 km) northeast of Sheridan, Wyoming and about 20 miles (32 km) southwest of Ashland. Birney is just outside the boundary of the Northern Cheyenne Indian Reservation.

According to the United States Census Bureau, the CDP has a total area of 15.1 square miles (39 km^{2}), all land.

=== Climate ===
According to the Köppen Climate Classification system, Birney has a semi-arid climate, abbreviated "BSk" on climate maps.

== Demographics ==
Historical population
Census	Pop.	Note	%±
2020	97		—
U.S. Decennial Census

As of the census of 2000, there were 108 people, 29 households, and 22 families residing in the CDP. The population density was 7.2 inhabitants per square mile (2.8/km^{2}). There were 39 housing units at an average density of 2.6 per square mile (1.0/km^{2}). The racial makeup of the CDP was 9.26% White, 86.11% Native American, 1.85% from other races, and 2.78% from two or more races. Hispanic or Latino of any race were 1.85% of the population.

There were 29 households, out of which 48.3% had children under the age of 18 living with them, 34.5% were married couples living together, 27.6% had a female householder with no husband present, and 20.7% were non-families. 20.7% of all households were made up of individuals, and none had someone living alone who was 65 years of age or older. The average household size was 3.72 and the average family size was 4.13.

In the CDP, the population was spread out, with 45.4% under the age of 18, 13.0% from 18 to 24, 18.5% from 25 to 44, 19.4% from 45 to 64, and 3.7% who were 65 years of age or older. The median age was 21 years. For every 100 females there were 100.0 males. For every 100 females age 18 and over, there were 110.7 males.

The median income for a household in the CDP was $15,417, and the median income for a family was $12,500. Males had a median income of $51,250 versus $0 for females. The per capita income for the CDP was $9,338. There were 50.0% of families and 50.0% of the population living below the poverty line, including 65.2% of those under 18 and 50.0% of those over 64.

== Media ==
The Forsyth-based Independent Press covers news for all of Rosebud County, which includes Birney.

== Notable person ==
- Frederic Remington (1861–1909) - western artist who lived at times near Birney
