= Ashland, Montana =

Ashland, Montana Vóhkoohémȧhoéve'ho'éno
- CDP
- Location of Ashland, Montana
- Coordinates: 45°36′50″N 106°17′35″W
- Country: United States
- State: Montana
- County: Rosebud

Area
  - Total: 20.67 sq mi (53.54 km^{2})
  - Land: 20.67 sq mi (53.54 km^{2})
  - Water: 0 sq mi (0.00 km^{2})
- Elevation: 2,982 ft (909 m)

Population (2020)
  - Total: 773
  - Density: 37.4/sq mi (14.44/km^{2})
- Time zone: UTC-7 (Mountain (MST))
  - Summer (DST): UTC-6 (MDT)
- ZIP codes: 59003-59004
- Area code: 406
- FIPS code: 30-02800
- GNIS feature ID: 2407774

Ashland (Cheyenne: Vóhkoohémȧhoéve'ho'éno) is a census-designated place (CDP) in Rosebud County, Montana, United States. As of the 2020 census, Ashland had a population of 773. Ashland is immediately east of the boundary of the Northern Cheyenne Indian Reservation and also along the Tongue River. It is the location of the St. Labre Indian Catholic High School, established in 1884 as a boarding school by a Catholic mission to the Cheyenne.

The town was established in 1881 and called Straders after the first postmaster. The name was changed to Ashland in 1886.

== Geography ==
According to the United States Census Bureau, the CDP has a total area of 7.6 square miles (20 km^{2}), all land.

Ashland had the original supervisor office for the Custer National Forest. There remains an Ashland Ranger District. The 436,000 acre Ashland Ranger District contains the largest contiguous block of land in Federal ownership in eastern Montana and has one of the largest grazing programs in the nation.

This area is also rich in coal and wildlife. Some oil and gas activity has taken place, but no producing wells have been found to date.

The area offers a variety of topography, varying from rolling grasslands to steep rock outcrops. Vegetation varies from prairie to dense stands of ponderosa pine.

=== Climate ===
According to the Köppen Climate Classification system, Ashland has a semi-arid climate, abbreviated "BSk" on climate maps.

== Demographics ==
Historical population
Census	Pop.	Note	%±
2020	773		—
U.S. Decennial Census

As of the census of 2000, there were 464 people, 151 households, and 104 families residing in the CDP. The population density was 61.4 inhabitants per square mile (23.7/km^{2}). There were 170 housing units at an average density of 22.5 per square mile (8.7/km^{2}). The racial makeup of the CDP was 21.55% White, 75.22% American Indian, 0.22% Asian, and 3.02% from two or more races. Hispanic or Latino of any race were 1.94% of the population.

There were 151 households, out of which 49.0% had children under the age of 18 living with them, 37.7% were married couples living together, 21.9% had a female householder with no husband present, and 30.5% were non-families. 25.8% of all households were made up of individuals, and 2.6% had someone living alone who was 65 years of age or older. The average household size was 3.07 and the average family size was 3.60.

In the CDP, the population was spread out, with 40.9% under the age of 18, 10.8% from 18 to 24, 30.0% from 25 to 44, 15.5% from 45 to 64, and 2.8% who were 65 years of age or older. The median age was 24 years. For every 100 females there were 93.3 males. For every 100 females age 18 and over, there were 87.7 males.

The median income for a household in the CDP was $22,222, and the median income for a family was $24,167. Males had a median income of $24,688 versus $19,000 for females. The per capita income for the CDP was $9,577. About 30.4% of families and 34.7% of the population were below the poverty line, including 41.1% of those under age 18 and none of those age 65 or over.

== Education ==
St. Labre Indian Catholic High School St. Labre Catholic School is home of the Braves and Lady Braves. Grades are Pre-K Through 12. The school has been established for almost 129 years now. St. Labre is in the 3-B district along with Lame Deer, Lodge Grass, Colstrip, Forsyth and Baker. The School is particularly known for their Boys and Girls Basketball team the Braves and Lady Braves.

Ashland Public School. Grades include K-8.

== Media ==
The Forsyth-based Independent Press covers news for all of Rosebud County, which includes Ashland.

== Economy ==
=== Emerging industries ===
As reported in the May 12, 2022, issue of Independent Press, a newspaper serving Rosebud County, officials made a visit to the site in Ashland for a planned factory that will make latex gloves. The Northern Cheyenne Tribe is backing the project. The factory expected be operational in 18 months, and employ up to 100 workers.
