= Rosebud County, Montana =

County in Montana, United States

- County
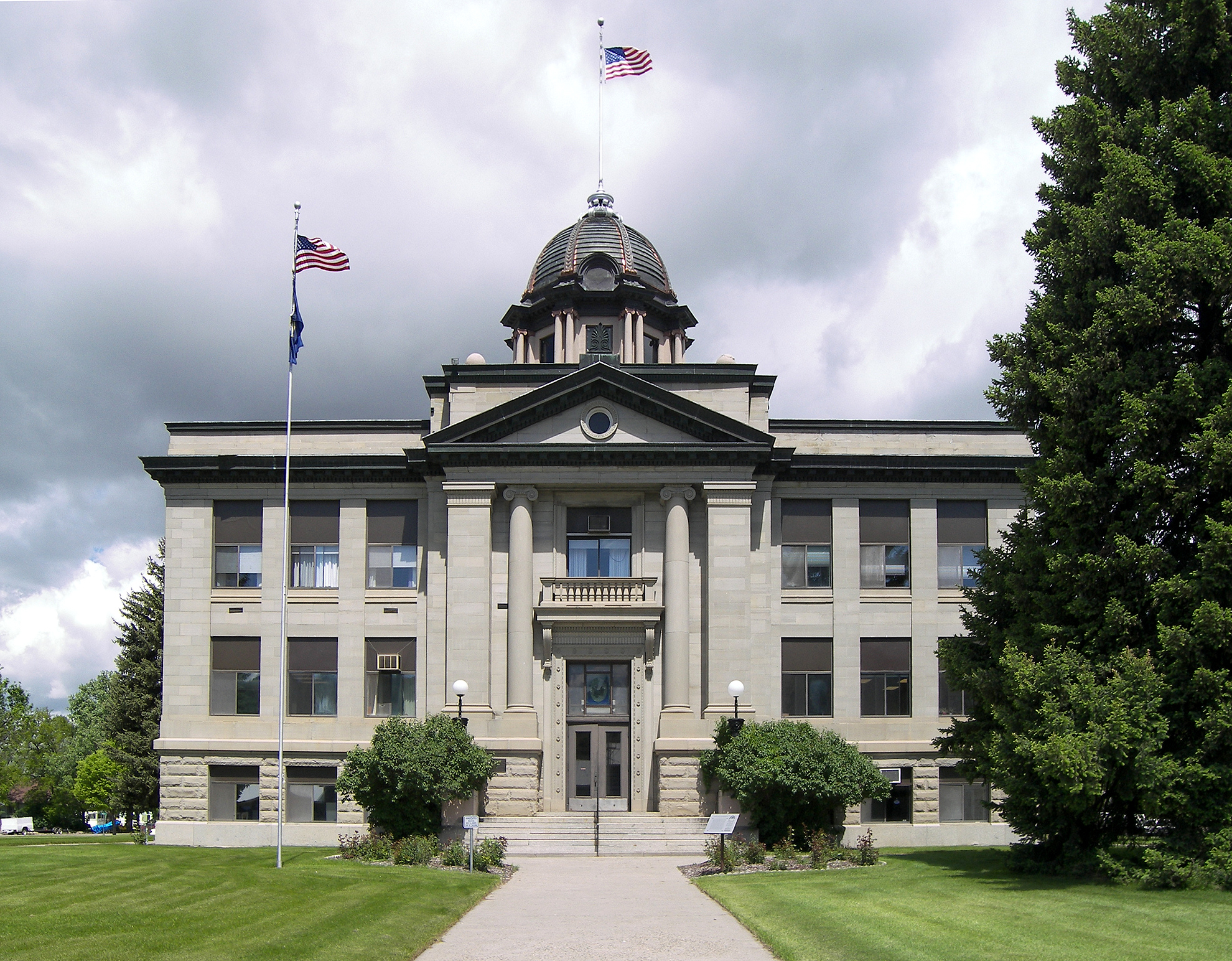
- County courthouse in Forsyth

- Location within the U.S. state of Montana
- Coordinates: 46°14′N 106°43′W
- Country: United States
- State: Montana
- Founded: February 11, 1901
- Named for: Rosebud River
- Seat: Forsyth
- Largest city: Colstrip

Area
  - Total: 5,027 sq mi (13,020 km^{2})
  - Land: 5,010 sq mi (13,000 km^{2})
  - Water: 17 sq mi (44 km^{2}) 0.3%

Population (2020)
  - Total: 8,329
  - Estimate (2025): 8,253 ▼
  - Density: 1.66/sq mi (0.642/km^{2})
- Time zone: UTC−7 (Mountain)
  - Summer (DST): UTC−6 (MDT)
- Congressional district: 2nd
- Website: rosebudcountymt.gov
- Montana county number 29

Rosebud County is a county in the state of Montana. It was established February 11, 1901, and has Montana vehicle license plate prefix 29. As of the 2020 census, the population was 8,329. Its county seat is Forsyth.

== Geography ==
According to the United States Census Bureau, the county has a total area of 5,027 square miles (13,020 km^{2}), of which 5,010 square miles (13,000 km^{2}) is land and 17 square miles (44 km^{2}) (0.3%) is water. It is the fourth-largest county in Montana by land area and fifth-largest by total area. Part of Custer National Forest is located in the county.

== Climate ==
According to the Köppen Climate Classification system, most of Rosebud County has a cold semi-arid climate, abbreviated "BSk" on climate maps.

Climate data for Brandenberg, Montana, 1991–2020 normals, extremes 1956–present
Month	Jan	Feb	Mar	Apr	May	Jun	Jul	Aug	Sep	Oct	Nov	Dec	Year
Record high °F (°C)	70 (21)	72 (22)	86 (30)	91 (33)	101 (38)	111 (44)	114 (46)	111 (44)	106 (41)	98 (37)	81 (27)	70 (21)	114 (46)
Mean maximum °F (°C)	56.4 (13.6)	58.6 (14.8)	72.7 (22.6)	82.1 (27.8)	87.9 (31.1)	96.4 (35.8)	103.0 (39.4)	102.1 (38.9)	97.5 (36.4)	84.3 (29.1)	68.9 (20.5)	56.4 (13.6)	104.7 (40.4)
Mean daily maximum °F (°C)	35.2 (1.8)	38.8 (3.8)	50.2 (10.1)	60.0 (15.6)	69.5 (20.8)	79.3 (26.3)	89.8 (32.1)	89.1 (31.7)	77.2 (25.1)	61.0 (16.1)	46.5 (8.1)	36.0 (2.2)	61.1 (16.1)
Daily mean °F (°C)	22.9 (−5.1)	26.3 (−3.2)	36.4 (2.4)	45.6 (7.6)	55.1 (12.8)	64.4 (18.0)	72.4 (22.4)	70.8 (21.6)	60.3 (15.7)	46.7 (8.2)	33.9 (1.1)	24.2 (−4.3)	46.6 (8.1)
Mean daily minimum °F (°C)	10.7 (−11.8)	13.9 (−10.1)	22.6 (−5.2)	31.3 (−0.4)	40.7 (4.8)	49.4 (9.7)	55.1 (12.8)	52.6 (11.4)	43.5 (6.4)	32.4 (0.2)	21.2 (−6.0)	12.5 (−10.8)	32.2 (0.1)
Mean minimum °F (°C)	−18.0 (−27.8)	−12.0 (−24.4)	−1.6 (−18.7)	14.9 (−9.5)	25.1 (−3.8)	37.2 (2.9)	44.6 (7.0)	39.8 (4.3)	29.0 (−1.7)	14.3 (−9.8)	−2.4 (−19.1)	−11.7 (−24.3)	−26.7 (−32.6)
Record low °F (°C)	−42 (−41)	−40 (−40)	−41 (−41)	−2 (−19)	16 (−9)	28 (−2)	34 (1)	30 (−1)	19 (−7)	−12 (−24)	−32 (−36)	−44 (−42)	−44 (−42)
Average precipitation inches (mm)	0.55 (14)	0.61 (15)	0.91 (23)	1.71 (43)	3.12 (79)	2.55 (65)	1.44 (37)	0.91 (23)	1.21 (31)	1.37 (35)	0.54 (14)	0.55 (14)	15.47 (393)
Average snowfall inches (cm)	7.5 (19)	8.0 (20)	6.9 (18)	4.0 (10)	0.5 (1.3)	0.0 (0.0)	0.0 (0.0)	0.0 (0.0)	0.0 (0.0)	1.7 (4.3)	4.4 (11)	7.4 (19)	40.4 (102.6)
Average precipitation days (≥ 0.01 in)	7.3	6.9	7.4	9.0	11.0	10.0	7.1	5.4	6.1	7.1	6.1	6.3	89.7
Average snowy days (≥ 0.1 in)	6.2	5.8	3.8	1.7	0.3	0.0	0.0	0.0	0.0	1.4	3.6	5.6	28.4
Source 1: NOAA
Source 2: National Weather Service

== Demographics ==
Historical population
Census	Pop.	Note	%±
1910	7,985		—
1920	8,002		0.2%
1930	7,347		−8.2%
1940	6,477		−11.8%
1950	6,570		1.4%
1960	6,187		−5.8%
1970	6,032		−2.5%
1980	9,899		64.1%
1990	10,505		6.1%
2000	9,383		−10.7%
2010	9,233		−1.6%
2020	8,329		−9.8%
2025 (est.)	8,253	▼	−0.9%
U.S. Decennial Census; 2010–2020

=== 2020 census ===
As of the 2020 census, the county had a population of 8,329. Of the residents, 27.1% were under the age of 18 and 17.3% were 65 years of age or older; the median age was 39.3 years. For every 100 females there were 102.1 males, and for every 100 females age 18 and over there were 100.6 males. 0.0% of residents lived in urban areas and 100.0% lived in rural areas.

The racial makeup of the county was 58.0% White, 0.2% Black or African American, 35.4% American Indian and Alaska Native, 0.5% Asian, 0.7% from some other race, and 5.1% from two or more races. Hispanic or Latino residents of any race comprised 2.8% of the population.

There were 3,145 households in the county, of which 30.6% had children under the age of 18 living with them and 23.5% had a female householder with no spouse or partner present. About 28.1% of all households were made up of individuals and 10.6% had someone living alone who was 65 years of age or older.

There were 3,780 housing units, of which 16.8% were vacant. Among occupied housing units, 67.7% were owner-occupied and 32.3% were renter-occupied. The homeowner vacancy rate was 2.0% and the rental vacancy rate was 13.3%.

=== 2010 census ===
As of the 2010 census, there were 9,233 people, 3,395 households, and 2,318 families residing in the county. The population density was 1.8 inhabitants per square mile (0.69/km^{2}). There were 4,057 housing units at an average density of 0.8 per square mile (0.31/km^{2}). The racial makeup of the county was 61.3% white, 34.7% American Indian, 0.5% Asian, 0.3% black or African American, 0.5% from other races, and 2.8% from two or more races. Those of Hispanic or Latino origin made up 3.4% of the population. In terms of ancestry, 25.0% were American, 19.0% were German, 6.9% were English, and 6.6% were Irish.

Of the 3,395 households, 36.4% had children under the age of 18 living with them, 51.3% were married couples living together, 10.6% had a female householder with no husband present, 31.7% were non-families, and 27.6% of all households were made up of individuals. The average household size was 2.70 and the average family size was 3.32. The median age was 36.5 years.

The median income for a household in the county was $44,776 and the median income for a family was $56,282. Males had a median income of $52,500 versus $28,306 for females. The per capita income for the county was $19,844. About 13.6% of families and 18.5% of the population were below the poverty line, including 24.7% of those under age 18 and 21.3% of those age 65 or over.

== Politics ==
Rosebud County leans Republican, though less so than most surrounding rural Montana counties. The Northern Cheyenne Reservation in the southern part of the county, which includes the communities of Ashland and Lame Deer, traditionally votes Democratic, while the northern part of the county, including Forsyth and Colstrip, vote solidly Republican. The county has voted for the Democratic presidential candidate in only 4 elections since 1964, the last being 2008. The county has seen strong Republican trends in more recent elections, with Donald Trump's performances in the county in 2020 and 2024 being the strongest Republican victories there since 1952.

United States presidential election results for Rosebud County, Montana
Year	Republican		Democratic		Third party(ies)	
Year	No.	%	No.	%	No.	%
1904	460	75.66%	134	22.04%	14	2.30%
1908	515	66.03%	235	30.13%	30	3.85%
1912	392	33.91%	313	27.08%	451	39.01%
1916	1,337	43.95%	1,608	52.86%	97	3.19%
1920	2,239	68.22%	873	26.60%	170	5.18%
1924	1,115	49.12%	259	11.41%	896	39.47%
1928	1,519	59.38%	1,025	40.07%	14	0.55%
1932	1,027	36.63%	1,646	58.70%	131	4.67%
1936	866	32.43%	1,624	60.82%	180	6.74%
1940	1,252	46.77%	1,399	52.26%	26	0.97%
1944	1,154	50.15%	1,114	48.41%	33	1.43%
1948	1,106	50.71%	1,031	47.27%	44	2.02%
1952	1,734	67.92%	805	31.53%	14	0.55%
1956	1,516	63.01%	890	36.99%	0	0.00%
1960	1,386	57.77%	1,002	41.77%	11	0.46%
1964	1,105	47.61%	1,212	52.22%	4	0.17%
1968	1,190	56.42%	711	33.71%	208	9.86%
1972	1,486	63.23%	777	33.06%	87	3.70%
1976	1,538	51.16%	1,413	47.01%	55	1.83%
1980	1,875	54.46%	1,167	33.89%	401	11.65%
1984	2,413	54.82%	1,920	43.62%	69	1.57%
1988	1,822	48.05%	1,869	49.29%	101	2.66%
1992	1,130	28.84%	1,669	42.60%	1,119	28.56%
1996	1,413	38.37%	1,681	45.64%	589	15.99%
2000	1,826	53.35%	1,394	40.72%	203	5.93%
2004	1,982	55.29%	1,520	42.40%	83	2.32%
2008	1,768	46.40%	1,919	50.37%	123	3.23%
2012	2,004	56.88%	1,422	40.36%	97	2.75%
2016	2,253	65.25%	987	28.58%	213	6.17%
2020	2,486	65.89%	1,199	31.78%	88	2.33%
2024	2,466	66.77%	1,095	29.65%	132	3.57%

== Communities ==
=== Cities ===
- Colstrip
- Forsyth (county seat)

=== Census-designated places ===
- Ashland
- Birney
- Lame Deer
- Rosebud

=== Unincorporated communities ===
- Ahles
- Angela
- Bascom
- Carterville
- Hathaway
- Ingomar
- Jimtown
- Rock Springs
- Sumatra
- Thurlow

=== Former communities ===
- Vananda

== Notable people ==
- Heather Sharfeddin – novelist, born in Rosebud County
- Frederic Remington (1861-1909) - famous western artist who lived at times, as late as 1901, on the Charles Boals ranch near Birney and the Cheyenne Indian Reservation where he hunted, painted and sketched.

== See also ==
- List of lakes in Rosebud County, Montana
- List of mountains in Rosebud County, Montana
- National Register of Historic Places listings in Rosebud County, Montana
