= Forsyth, Montana =

- City
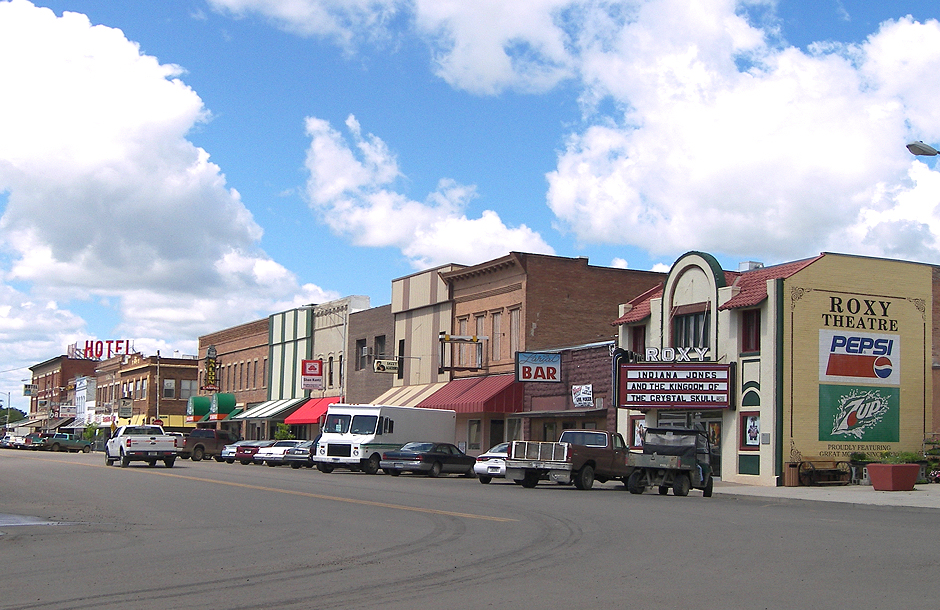
- Downtown Forsyth

- Location of Forsyth, Montana
- Coordinates: 46°16′01″N 106°40′30″W
- Country: United States
- State: Montana
- County: Rosebud

Area
  - Total: 1.17 sq mi (3.03 km^{2})
  - Land: 1.15 sq mi (2.98 km^{2})
  - Water: 0.019 sq mi (0.05 km^{2})
- Elevation: 2,523 ft (769 m)

Population (2020)
  - Total: 1,647
  - Density: 1,432.0/sq mi (552.89/km^{2})
- Time zone: UTC-7 (Mountain (MST))
  - Summer (DST): UTC-6 (MDT)
- ZIP code: 59327
- Area code: 406
- FIPS code: 30-27700
- GNIS feature ID: 2410523
- Website: www.forsythmt.info

Forsyth is a city in and the county seat of Rosebud County, Montana, United States. The population was 1,647 at the 2020 census. Forsyth was established in 1876 as the first settlement on the Yellowstone River, and in 1882 residents named the town after General James William Forsyth who commanded Fort Maginnis, Montana during the Indian Wars and the 7th Cavalry at the Wounded Knee Massacre. The town has long been a transportation nexus, starting with steamboats on the river and progressing to the Northern Pacific Railway and Interstate 94.

== History ==
Forsyth was established as a settlement on the Yellowstone in 1876 as a steamboat landing supporting United States Army operations in the Indian Wars.

in 1882, Thomas Alexander traded land to the Northern Pacific Railway to start the town, and developed four buildings on main street.

On April 21, 1894, several hundred men of Coxey's Army, inspired by Jacob Coxey and led by William Hogan, commandeered a Northern Pacific Railway train in Butte, Montana headed for Washington, DC. After stopping in Bozeman, they fought Federal Marshals in Billings with one man killed and several wounded. They were finally apprehended in Forsyth on April 25, by five companies of the 22nd Infantry Regiment and Troop L, 8th Cavalry from Fort Keogh, Cheyenne soldiers known as "Casey's scouts." The incident marked one of the few instances in American history where U.S. Native American troops were used against white civilians. Although some escapes occurred, 331 of the Coxeyites were taken to Helena as prisoners.

In the 1980s Forsyth served as the home of the United States Air Force 1st Combat Evaluation Group Detachment 18, evaluating radar observability for B-52s on training runs.

== Geography ==
Forsyth is located along the south bank of the Yellowstone River.

According to the United States Census Bureau, the city has a total area of 0.99 square miles (2.56 km^{2}), all land.

=== Climate ===
According to the Köppen Climate Classification system, Forsyth has a cold semi-arid climate, abbreviated "BSk" on climate maps.

Climate data for Forsyth, Montana, 1991–2020 normals, extremes 1975–present
Month	Jan	Feb	Mar	Apr	May	Jun	Jul	Aug	Sep	Oct	Nov	Dec	Year
Record high °F (°C)	70 (21)	73 (23)	86 (30)	91 (33)	99 (37)	108 (42)	118 (48)	106 (41)	105 (41)	93 (34)	82 (28)	70 (21)	118 (48)
Mean maximum °F (°C)	56.9 (13.8)	59.5 (15.3)	72.6 (22.6)	81.9 (27.7)	88.1 (31.2)	95.7 (35.4)	100.7 (38.2)	99.1 (37.3)	94.7 (34.8)	83.2 (28.4)	68.9 (20.5)	57.4 (14.1)	102.0 (38.9)
Mean daily maximum °F (°C)	33.7 (0.9)	38.0 (3.3)	49.3 (9.6)	59.2 (15.1)	68.8 (20.4)	78.5 (25.8)	88.0 (31.1)	86.5 (30.3)	75.4 (24.1)	60.0 (15.6)	46.1 (7.8)	35.4 (1.9)	59.9 (15.5)
Daily mean °F (°C)	21.9 (−5.6)	25.7 (−3.5)	36.3 (2.4)	46.1 (7.8)	55.8 (13.2)	65.2 (18.4)	73.1 (22.8)	71.1 (21.7)	60.5 (15.8)	46.8 (8.2)	33.9 (1.1)	24.0 (−4.4)	46.7 (8.2)
Mean daily minimum °F (°C)	10.2 (−12.1)	13.5 (−10.3)	23.3 (−4.8)	32.9 (0.5)	42.8 (6.0)	52.0 (11.1)	58.2 (14.6)	55.8 (13.2)	45.6 (7.6)	33.7 (0.9)	21.7 (−5.7)	12.6 (−10.8)	33.5 (0.8)
Mean minimum °F (°C)	−15.4 (−26.3)	−9.6 (−23.1)	1.2 (−17.1)	18.7 (−7.4)	28.4 (−2.0)	40.7 (4.8)	48.7 (9.3)	43.4 (6.3)	31.6 (−0.2)	16.8 (−8.4)	−0.5 (−18.1)	−10.0 (−23.3)	−23.6 (−30.9)
Record low °F (°C)	−38 (−39)	−38 (−39)	−31 (−35)	1 (−17)	19 (−7)	34 (1)	41 (5)	32 (0)	19 (−7)	−11 (−24)	−27 (−33)	−44 (−42)	−44 (−42)
Average precipitation inches (mm)	0.61 (15)	0.58 (15)	0.94 (24)	1.85 (47)	2.92 (74)	2.54 (65)	1.38 (35)	1.19 (30)	1.38 (35)	1.37 (35)	0.66 (17)	0.58 (15)	16.00 (406)
Average snowfall inches (cm)	7.7 (20)	7.3 (19)	3.9 (9.9)	2.8 (7.1)	0.4 (1.0)	0.0 (0.0)	0.0 (0.0)	0.0 (0.0)	0.1 (0.25)	1.5 (3.8)	4.0 (10)	6.9 (18)	34.6 (89.05)
Average precipitation days (≥ 0.01 in)	6.3	5.9	6.6	8.3	10.6	10.1	7.2	5.5	5.7	7.0	5.8	5.3	84.3
Average snowy days (≥ 0.1 in)	4.9	3.3	2.7	1.0	0.2	0.0	0.0	0.0	0.1	0.8	2.5	3.7	19.2
Source 1: NOAA
Source 2: National Weather Service

== Demographics ==
Historical population
Census	Pop.	Note	%±
1890	308		—
1910	1,398		—
1920	1,838		31.5%
1930	1,591		−13.4%
1940	1,696		6.6%
1950	1,906		12.4%
1960	2,032		6.6%
1970	1,873		−7.8%
1980	2,553		36.3%
1990	2,178		−14.7%
2000	1,944		−10.7%
2010	1,777		−8.6%
2020	1,647		−7.3%
U.S. Decennial Census

=== 2020 census ===
As of the 2020 census, Forsyth had a population of 1,647. The median age was 51.8 years. 17.1% of residents were under the age of 18 and 29.4% of residents were 65 years of age or older. For every 100 females there were 101.8 males, and for every 100 females age 18 and over there were 99.0 males age 18 and over.

0.0% of residents lived in urban areas, while 100.0% lived in rural areas.

There were 777 households in Forsyth, of which 19.3% had children under the age of 18 living in them. Of all households, 47.2% were married-couple households, 22.9% were households with a male householder and no spouse or partner present, and 25.2% were households with a female householder and no spouse or partner present. About 36.4% of all households were made up of individuals and 16.6% had someone living alone who was 65 years of age or older.

There were 968 housing units, of which 19.7% were vacant. The homeowner vacancy rate was 3.6% and the rental vacancy rate was 19.1%.

Racial composition as of the 2020 census
Race	Number	Percent
White	1,508	91.6%
Black or African American	11	0.7%
American Indian and Alaska Native	32	1.9%
Asian	12	0.7%
Native Hawaiian and Other Pacific Islander	0	0.0%
Some other race	7	0.4%
Two or more races	77	4.7%
Hispanic or Latino (of any race)	37	2.2%

=== 2010 census ===
As of the census of 2010, there were 1,777 people, 807 households, and 472 families residing in the city. The population density was 1,794.9 inhabitants per square mile (693.0/km^{2}). There were 921 housing units at an average density of 930.3 per square mile (359.2/km^{2}). The racial makeup of the city was 95.0% White, 0.5% African American, 1.6% Native American, 0.8% Asian, 0.1% Pacific Islander, 0.6% from other races, and 1.5% from two or more races. Hispanic or Latino of any race were 2.4% of the population.

There were 807 households, of which 26.0% had children under the age of 18 living with them, 45.8% were married couples living together, 8.2% had a female householder with no husband present, 4.5% had a male householder with no wife present, and 41.5% were non-families. 36.6% of all households were made up of individuals, and 15.8% had someone living alone who was 65 years of age or older. The average household size was 2.15 and the average family size was 2.78.

The median age in the city was 46.4 years. 22.2% of residents were under the age of 18; 6.6% were between the ages of 18 and 24; 18.9% were from 25 to 44; 32.4% were from 45 to 64; and 20% were 65 years of age or older. The gender makeup of the city was 50.1% male and 49.9% female.

=== 2000 census ===
As of the census of 2000, there were 1,944 people, 826 households, and 525 families residing in the city. The population density was 1,759.0 inhabitants per square mile (679.2/km^{2}). There were 976 housing units at an average density of 883.1 per square mile (341.0/km^{2}). The racial makeup of the city was 95.42% White, 0.21% African American, 2.26% Native American, 0.82% Asian, 0.31% from other races, and 0.98% from two or more races. Hispanic or Latino of any race were 1.23% of the population.

There were 826 households, out of which 29.8% had children under the age of 18 living with them, 52.7% were married couples living together, 7.4% had a female householder with no husband present, and 36.4% were non-families. 32.9% of all households were made up of individuals, and 14.4% had someone living alone who was 65 years of age or older. The average household size was 2.28 and the average family size was 2.89.

In the city, the population was spread out, with 25.1% under the age of 18, 5.4% from 18 to 24, 25.2% from 25 to 44, 27.0% from 45 to 64, and 17.4% who were 65 years of age or older. The median age was 42 years. For every 100 females there were 98.2 males. For every 100 females age 18 and over, there were 96.8 males.

The median income for a household in the city was $33,533, and the median income for a family was $44,100. Males had a median income of $36,827 versus $19,038 for females. The per capita income for the city was $17,994. About 9.4% of families and 10.5% of the population were below the poverty line, including 14.4% of those under age 18 and 11.4% of those age 65 or over.

== Government ==
Forsyth has a mayor and city council. Incumbent mayor Dennis Kopitzke was unopposed in the November 2025 election.

== Education ==
Forsyth High School offers a variety of classes and is developing capabilities under a technology plan to prepare its students for higher education. The plan has been updated frequently since 1997, and features plans for maintaining internet capability, and laboratory instrument capabilities.

The Forsyth Dogies play in the 3B conference with the Baker Spartans, Colstrip Colts, Lame Deer Morningstars, Lodge Grass Indians, and St.Labre Braves. The school colors are purple and white.

Rosebud County Library serves the area.

== Media ==
Forsyth's local newspaper is the Independent Press.

There are two radio stations licensed in Forsyth - KIKC-AM and KIKC-FM They also receive stations from Miles City.

== Infrastructure ==
The city is served by Interstate 94 and US routes 12 and 10.

Tillitt Field Airport is a public use airport located 3 miles east of town.

== Notable people ==
- Samuel Russell Barr, Minnesota state representative
- John Melcher, U.S. senator from Montana and mayor of Forsyth
- Carol Thurston, actress

== See also ==
- List of municipalities in Montana
