= APF =

APF, or apf, may refer to:

== Organizations ==
- Aboriginal Publications Foundation, a former arts and publishing body in Australia (1970–1982)
- Alicia Patterson Foundation, an annual journalism foundation and award
- Alliance for Peace and Freedom, a far-right European party
- American Healthcare Professionals and Friends for Medicine in Israel
- Anglican Pacifist Fellowship, established 1937
- Anguilla Police Force, renamed the Royal Anguilla Police Force in 1990
- Anti-Privatisation Forum, former South African body
- Armed Police Force, a paramilitary land force in Nepal
- Assemblée parlementaire de la Francophonie, an international association of French-speaking parliaments
- Association of Professional Futurists

== Sports ==
- Arena Pro Football, an American indoor football league that merged to form the American Arena League in 2018
- Asociación Paraguaya de Fútbol, the Paraguayan Football Association

== Technology ==
- APF Electronics Inc., a defunct American consumer electronics company
- Automated Planet Finder, a telescope
- APF Imagination Machine, a video game console and home computer system
- Atomic packing factor, in crystallography

== Codes ==
- APF, the IATA code for Naples Airport (Florida) in the state of Florida, US
- apf, the ISO 639-3 code for the Paranan Agta language spoken in the northern Philippines
- APF, the National Rail code for Appleford railway station in the county of Oxfordshire, UK

== Other uses ==
- Alaska Permanent Fund, a state-run permanent fund in Alaska
- American Police Force, a fraudulent entity
- Asset purchase facility, for Bank of England quantitative easing
- Australian Pharmaceutical Formulary, the national formulary used by pharmacists in Australia
