= Manuel Antonio Mercado =

- Manuel Antonio Mercado, Mexican jurist and statesman
- Born: Manuel Antonio Mercado y de la Paz; January 28, 1838; La Piedad de Cabadas, Michoacán, Mexico
- Died: June 9, 1909 (aged 71); Mexico City, Mexico
- Education: National School of Jurisprudence
- Occupations: Lawyer; politician; civil servant
- Known for: Prominent Mexican jurist; confidant of José Martí and custodian of his political testament
- Title: Undersecretary of the Interior (1882–1909)

Manuel Antonio Mercado y de la Paz (28 January 1838 – 9 June 1909) was a Mexican jurist, politician, and long-serving civil servant. A member of the bar from 1861, he served as a federal deputy and senator in the Congress of the Union, Secretary of Government for the Federal District during the administration of Sebastián Lerdo de Tejada, and uninterruptedly as Undersecretary of the Interior (Gobernación) from 1882 until his death in 1909.

He is widely remembered in Latin American history for his intimate friendship and intellectual fraternity with Cuban national hero and writer José Martí. Mercado was Martí's foremost benefactor and confidant, preserving over a hundred personal letters, including Martí's final, unfinished letter of 18 May 1895, considered his political and anti-imperialist testament. Martí famously immortalized their bond in his 1891 poetry collection Versos sencillos.

== Legal and political career ==
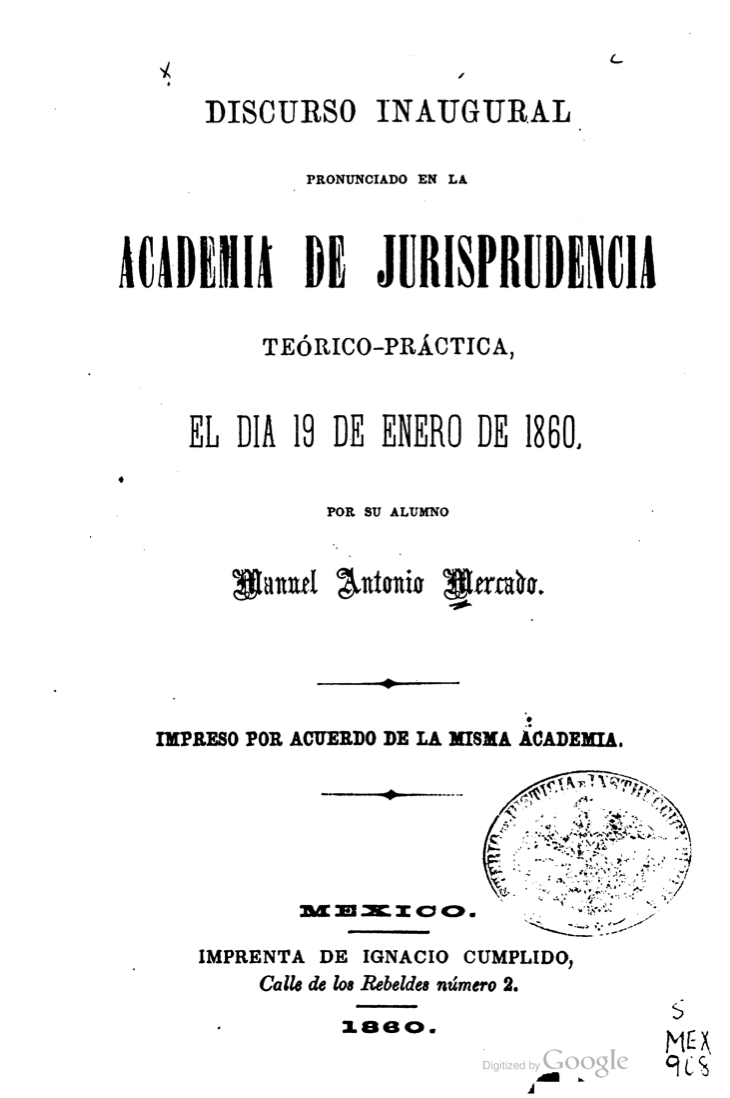
Cover of Mercado's 1860 inaugural address delivered at the Academy of Theoretical and Practical Jurisprudence.

Mercado was born in La Piedad de Cabadas, Michoacán. While a law student, on 19 January 1860 he delivered the inaugural address at the Academy of Theoretical and Practical Jurisprudence in Mexico City, a speech later published by Imprenta de Ignacio Cumplido. He earned his law degree in 1861 and returned to Michoacán, where he was appointed chief officer of the state government secretariat.

Following the restoration of the Republic in 1867, Mercado was elected federal deputy to the Congress of the Union for several terms and subsequently served as a Senator. In the judicial administration, he acted as public defender (abogado de pobres) for the Supreme Court of Justice, Secretary General of Government of the Federal District, and Vice President of the Mexican Academy of Jurisprudence and Legislation.

In 1882, during the presidency of General Manuel González Flores, he was appointed Undersecretary of the Interior (Subsecretario de Gobernación). He retained this high administrative position throughout the successive presidencies of Porfirio Díaz, administering the ministry with recognized technical integrity until his death in Mexico City on 9 June 1909.

== Friendship with José Martí ==
In early 1875, when José Martí arrived in Mexico following his deportation to Spain, his impoverished family was already residing in a house adjacent to Mercado's home. Several personal ties fostered their meeting: the Michoacán painter Manuel Ocaranza, an intimate friend of Mercado who kept his studio in Mercado's residence, was courting Martí's sister, Ana. Mercado helped secure garment work for the Martí family and paid for Ana's burial expenses upon her sudden death in 1875.

Mercado introduced Martí into the intellectual circle of the Mexican capital and secured his position as an editorialist for the Revista Universal. When Martí married Carmen Zayas-Bazán in Mexico City in 1877, Mercado served as the official civil witness. Over two decades, Martí regularly addressed Mercado in correspondence as his "dearest brother" (hermano queridísimo) and "spiritual brother". During his second visit to Mexico in 1894, Martí stayed at Mercado's residence while seeking diplomatic support and fundraising for the liberation movement.

In his 1891 volume Versos sencillos, Martí celebrated the steadfastness of their bond in poem XXXIX:

Tiene el conde su abolengo:
tiene la aurora el mendigo:
tiene ala el ave: yo tengo
allá en México un amigo.

(The count has his noble lineage:
the beggar has the dawn:
the bird has its wing: I have
over there in Mexico a friend.)

— José Martí, Versos sencillos (1891)

Through this parallelism, Martí contrasted material wealth and hereditary status with spiritual solace, placing Mercado's enduring loyalty on the same essential plane as the dawn for the dispossessed and wings for a bird in flight.

=== The 18 May 1895 letter ===
On 18 May 1895, at the insurgent military encampment of Dos Ríos on the eve of his death in combat, Martí penned his final letter to Mercado. In it, he outlined the geopolitical rationale of the Cuban War of Independence:

...I am in daily danger of giving my life for my country and my duty [...] of preventing in time, with the independence of Cuba, the United States from expanding across the Antilles and falling with that additional force upon our lands of America. Everything I have done to this day, and will do, is for that purpose.

— José Martí to Manuel Mercado, 18 May 1895

Mercado carefully preserved the collection of letters and manuscripts received from Martí between 1876 and 1895. Following Mercado's death, the archive was safeguarded by his descendants and was first edited and published in 1946 by the National Autonomous University of Mexico (UNAM), providing historians with a foundational primary archive for understanding Martí's biography and political thought.

== See also ==
- José Martí
- Cuba–Mexico relations
- Versos sencillos

== Bibliography ==
- Argüelles Espinosa, Luis Ángel (1992). "Amigos mexicanos de José Martí: Manuel Mercado". Boletín del Instituto de Investigaciones Bibliográficas (6). Universidad Nacional Autónoma de México: 225–228.
- Camp, Roderic Ai (1991). Mexican Political Biographies, 1884–1935. University of Texas Press. ISBN 978-0-292-75119-4.
- Martí, José (2003). Epistolario a Manuel Mercado. Havana: Centro de Estudios Martianos. ISBN 959-7006-72-3.
