= Two Rivers =

Two Rivers may refer to:

== Places ==
=== North America ===
- Two Rivers, Alaska, a census-designated place in Fairbanks North Star Borough
- Two Rivers, former name of Dos Rios, California, in the valley of Jonah
- Two River (Mississippi River tributary), a river in Minnesota
- Two Rivers (Red River of the North tributary), a river in Minnesota
- Two Rivers (town), Wisconsin
- Two Rivers, Wisconsin
- Two Rivers Township, Morrison County, Minnesota
- Bdóte, where the Minnesota and Mississippi Rivers meet, also known as the birthplace of the Dakota

=== Elsewhere ===
- Two Rivers Way, footpath in Somerset, England
- Mesopotamia, the Land of the Two Rivers or The Two Rivers, referring to the Tigris and Euphrates rivers

== Schools ==
- Two Rivers High School (disambiguation), several schools
- Two Rivers Magnet Middle School, East Hartford, Connecticut
- Two Rivers School District, Yell County, Arkansas

== Entertainment ==
- Two Rivers, a 2007 album by Iraqi-American trumpeter Amir ElSaffar
- "Two Rivers" (song), a 1985 song by Northern Irish band The Adventures
- "Two Rivers", a 1989 song by Jeff Beck from the album Jeff Beck's Guitar Shop
- Two Rivers (The Wheel of Time), an isolated region in Robert Jordan's novels, in which the series begins
- Billy Two Rivers (born 1935), Canadian professional wrestler and politician
- "Joe Two Rivers", a major character in the 1963-65 Canadian television series The Forest Rangers
- Junji Hirata (born 1956), Japanese professional wrestler a.k.a. "Sonny Two Rivers"
- E. Donald Two-Rivers (?–2008), American playwright

== Other uses ==
- Two Rivers Correctional Institution, Umatilla, Oregon
- Two Rivers Detention Facility, Hardin, Montana
- Two Rivers Dam, dry dam in southeastern New Mexico
- Two Rivers Light, Wisconsin lighthouse
- Two Rivers Mansion (Nashville, Tennessee), historic house
- Two Rivers mine, bord and pillar mine in South Africa
- Two Rivers Press, English company
- Two Rivers Psychiatric Hospital, Kansas City, Missouri
- Two Rivers Ranch, cattle ranch business in Florida
- Battle of Two Rivers (671) in Caledonia
- Order of the Two Rivers, award given by kings and presidents of Iraq
- "Ardulfurataini", national anthem of Iraq from 1981 to 2003

== See also ==
- Deux Rivières (disambiguation)
- Dos Rios (disambiguation)
