= American Police Force =

Fraudulent entity claiming to be a private military company

American Private Police Force
- Founder: Michael Hilton
- Headquarters: United States
- Website: americanpolicegroup.com Now defunct

American Police Force (APF), and under its revised name American Private Police Force, was a fraudulent entity claiming to be a private military company. It never possessed any legitimacy to operate in the United States. The company's previous logo was an exact copy of the coat of arms of Serbia, which caused controversy and resulted in the Serbian government threatening legal action against APF if it did not remove or change the logo.

In September 2009, US government contract databases showed no record of the company, while security industry representatives and federal officials said they had never heard of it.

APF was registered as a corporation in California by convicted con man Michael Hilton on 2 March 2009. However, the company did not have a business license to operate in California or Montana. Hilton was also discovered to have an extensive criminal history.

Services offered by APF included "interdicting terror activity, interdicting weapons of mass destruction, international airline security, cheating spouse investigations, polygraph testing, kidnapping response, and weapons sales, including 'Nuclear/Biological/Chemical (WMD).'"

On October 5, 2009, Academi (formerly Blackwater and Xe and now Constellis) denied being affiliated with APF.

== Taking over a Montana jail facility ==
In 2009, APF was contracted to control and operate the Two Rivers Detention Facility, a prison facility which had been empty for over two years in Hardin, a town in Montana's Big Horn County. The contract was reportedly a 10-year, multimillion-dollar deal.

According to a CBS News article, dated September 29, 2009, the APF was "a little known company which claims to specialize in training military and security forces overseas", which has "seemingly taken control of a $27 million, never-used jail, and a rural Montana town's nonexistent police force." Following APF's Mercedes SUVs entering the community with "City of Hardin Police Department" stenciled on the side of its vehicles, a city official released a statement dismissing such accusations: "There are no commandos in the streets. There is no fence or gate being built around Hardin. People are free to come and go as they please. APF is not running our town or our police force." The city of Hardin had no official police department, and traditionally relied on the Big Horn County Sheriffs department police protection.

According to a reporter's blog dated October 1, 2009, on the USA Today website, it is unclear why and by which authority the APF had taken control over the empty jail facility. However, CNN had reported in April 2009 that Hardin city officials might invite and willingly host a Guantanamo Bay detention camp-style prison in order to improve the economic situation of the city, even though Senator Max Baucus of Montana opposed the idea and said that it would be a security risk.

Steve Bullock, the Attorney General of Montana, investigated APF for possible violations of the Montana Unfair Trade Practices and Consumer Protection Act in connection with dubious statements on APF's website with regard to APF's operations and supposed contracts with the federal government.

As the story unveiled, Serbian authorities stated that the coat of arms appearing in the APF logo was being used illegally and requested its removal and a California attorney who worked with APF cut his ties to the project.

Michael Cohen, a former supervisor for the Secret Service, was named by Michael Hilton as the future operations director for the jail facility. Cohen, who served 14 months in prison for stealing $2,800 from the government, admitted submitting a resume to APF several weeks before, but decided not to follow it up when Michael Hilton declined to give him information about the company.

On October 9, it was announced that American Police Force would not be taking over the jail after all. It spokeswoman, Becky Shay, a former beat reporter for the Billings Gazette, denied any wrongdoings on the part of the company, but said, "Two Rivers deserves a considerably less-controversial partner."

On October 13, Steve Bullock, the Attorney General of Montana, dropped his investigation.

== Michael Hilton ==
Orange County court records list the following aliases for Michael Hilton, the head of APF:

- Michael Hilton
- Midrag Ilia Dokovitch
- Michael Anthony Hilton
- Michael Miodrag
- Michael Djokic
- Miodrag Dokich
- Anthony Michael Hilton
- Michael Dokich
- Midrag Ilia Dokovich
- Miodrag Djokic
- Michael Ilia Hilton
- David Michael Comella
- Michael Kokich
- Djokic Michael Miodrag
- Michael Dokovich
- Miodrag Mic Djokic
- Michael Djokich

The alias Michael Miodrag is listed as being involved in a 2007 multimillion-dollar fraud case in Australia. Australian authorities said they want to question him but no charges have been filed.

== Becky Shay ==
Becky Shay (born Rebecca Lee Shay on January 3, 1969) is APF's spokesman and only employee in Montana. Shay filed two reports about the company before abruptly leaving her job as a reporter for the Billings Gazette to begin working with APF as a spokesman in less than 24 hours.

Following the APF's involvement with the Two Rivers Detention Facility, Shay worked as a crime analyst for the Billings Police Department from November 2011 to 2016, when she became the department's Records Supervisor.
