= PF Fire =

2021 wildfire in Montana

- Date: July 27, 2021 – August 4, 2021
- Location: Hardin, Montana
- Coordinates: 45.904°N 107.368°W

Statistics
- Burned area: 66,134 acres (26,763 ha)

Ignition
- Cause: Coal Seam

Map
- Location in Northern Montana

The PF Fire was a wildfire that started near Hardin, Montana on June 18, 2021. The fire has burned 66,134 acres (26,763 ha) and was fully contained on August 4, 2021.

== Events ==
=== July ===
The PF Fire was first reported on July 27, 2021 at around 1:30 pm MST.

=== Cause ===
The cause of the fire is believed to be due to a coal seam.

=== Containment ===
On August 4, 2021, the PF Fire reached 100% containment.

== See also ==
- 2021 Montana wildfires
- List of Montana wildfires
