= Deux Rivières (disambiguation) =

Deux Rivières is a commune in the department of Yonne, central France.

Deux Rivières may also refer to:

- Canton of Deux Rivières et Vallées, Haute-Loire, France
- Deux-Rivières, Ontario, Canada

== See also ==
- Les Deux Rives, a school in Mission, British Columbia, Canada
- Canton of Les Deux Rives, Tarn, France
- Dos Rios (disambiguation)
- Two Rivers (disambiguation)
