= KRWS-LP =

- Hardin, Montana; United States
- Frequency: 100.7 MHz

Programming
- Format: Variety

Ownership
- Owner: Greater Hardin Association

Technical information
- Licensing authority: FCC
- Facility ID: 134773
- Class: L1
- Power: 14 watts
- HAAT: 79.3 meters (260 ft)
- Transmitter coordinates: 45°44′43″N 107°32′3″W
- Repeater: K233BD 94.5 Hardin

Links
- Public license information: LMS
- Webcast: KRWS-LP Webstream
- Website: KRWS-LP Online

KRWS-LP (100.7 FM) is a radio station licensed to Hardin, Montana, United States. The station is currently owned by Greater Hardin Association.

The station broadcasts local high school sports for Hardin.
