= Carroll Graham =

American politician

Carroll Adrian Graham (14 December 1913 - 16 January 1991) was an American politician who served in the Montana Senate.

== Early life and career ==
Graham was born in Hardin on 14 December 1913. From the age of two until twelve, he grew up on a homestead in Jordan. From the age of twelve, he grew up on a ranch and went to school in the Lodge Grass area. He graduated from school in 1932 and later attended a polytechnic. He was a member of various boards including the Montana Livestock Association and Farmers Union Oil Company.

== Political career ==
In 1960, Graham ran as a Democratic Party candidate for the Montana Senate. He was successfully elected and represented Big Horn County in the state senate for 24 years.

In 1975, he became President Pro Tempore of the senate.

== Personal life ==
Graham was married to his wife for over 51 years and had children. He died of natural causes on 16 January 1991, aged 77.
