= Dos Rios =

Dos Rios or Dos Ríos may refer to:

- Dos Rios, California, United States
  - Dos Rios AVA, California wine region in Mendocino County
- Dos Rios State Park in California
- Dos Ríos, Chiriquí, Panama
- Dos Ríos, Veracruz, Mexico
- Dos Ríos District, Alajuela, Costa Rica
- Battle of Dos Ríos, in Cuba

== See also ==
- Two Rivers (disambiguation)
- Deux Rivières (disambiguation)
