= José Martí =

Cuban national hero (1853–1895)

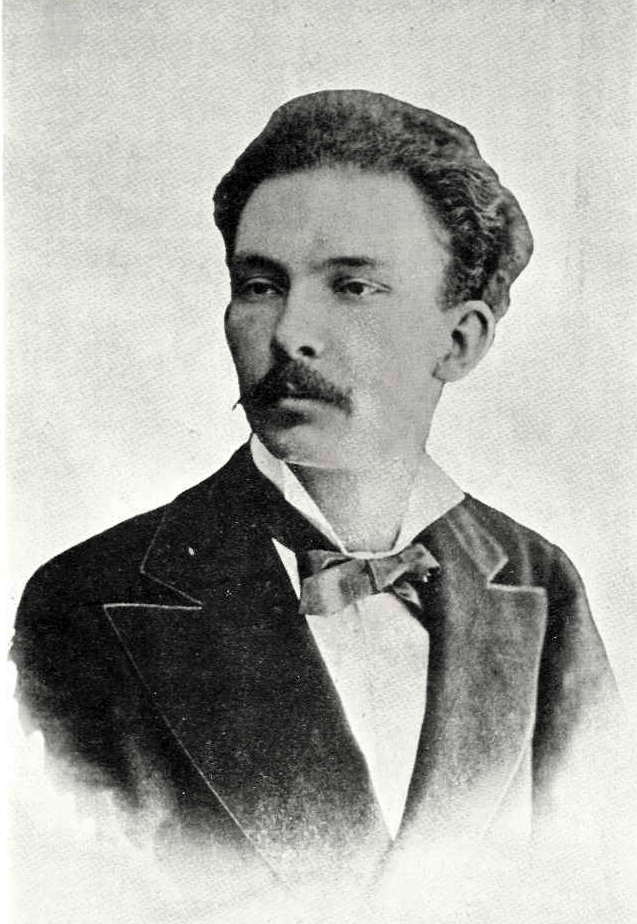
- Martí in 1875
- Born: José Julián Martí Pérez; 28 January 1853; Havana, Cuba, Spanish Empire
- Died: 19 May 1895 (aged 42); Dos Ríos, Cuba, Spanish Empire
- Resting place: Santa Ifigenia Cemetery
- Organization: Cuban Revolutionary Party
- Notable work: Ismaelillo (1882); Versos sencillos (1891)
- Movement: Modernismo
- Spouse: María del Carmen Zayas-Bazán e Hidalgo (m. 1878)
- Children: 2

José Julián Martí Pérez (Note: In this name that follows Hispanic American naming customs, the first or paternal surname is Martí and the second or maternal family name is Pérez.) (Spanish: [xoˈse maɾˈti]; 28 January 1853 – 19 May 1895) was a Cuban nationalist, poet, philosopher, essayist, journalist, translator, professor, and publisher, who is considered a Cuban national hero because of his role in the liberation of his country from Spain. He was also an important figure in Latin American literature. He was a political activist and is considered an important philosopher and political theorist. Through his writings and political activity, he became a symbol of Cuba's bid for independence from the Spanish Empire in the 19th century and is referred to as the "Apostle of Cuban Independence". From adolescence on, he dedicated his life to the promotion of liberty, political independence for Cuba, and intellectual independence for all Spanish Americans; his death was used as a cry for Cuban independence from Spain by both the Cuban revolutionaries and those Cubans previously reluctant to start a revolt.

Born in Havana, Spanish Empire, Martí began his political activism at an early age. He traveled extensively in Spain, Latin America, and the United States, raising awareness and support for the cause of Cuban independence. His unification of the Cuban émigré community, particularly in Florida, was crucial to the success of the Cuban War of Independence against Spain. He was a key figure in the planning and execution of this war, as well as the designer of the Cuban Revolutionary Party and its ideology. He died in military action during the Battle of Dos Ríos on 19 May 1895. Martí is considered one of the great turn-of-the-century Latin American intellectuals. His written works include a series of poems, essays, letters, lectures, a novel, and a children's magazine.

He wrote for numerous Latin American and American newspapers; he also founded a number of newspapers. One of those newspapers, Patria, was an important instrument in his campaign for Cuban independence. After his death, many of his verses from the book Versos Sencillos (Simple Verses) were adapted to the patriotic song "Guantanamera", which has become a prominent representative song of Cuba. The concepts of freedom, liberty and democracy are prominent themes in all of his works, which were influential on Nicaraguan poet Rubén Darío and Chilean poet Gabriela Mistral. Especially following the 1959 Cuban Revolution, Martí's ideology became a major rhetorical motif in Cuban politics. He is also regarded as Cuba's "martyr".

== Life ==
=== Early life, Cuba: 1853–70 ===
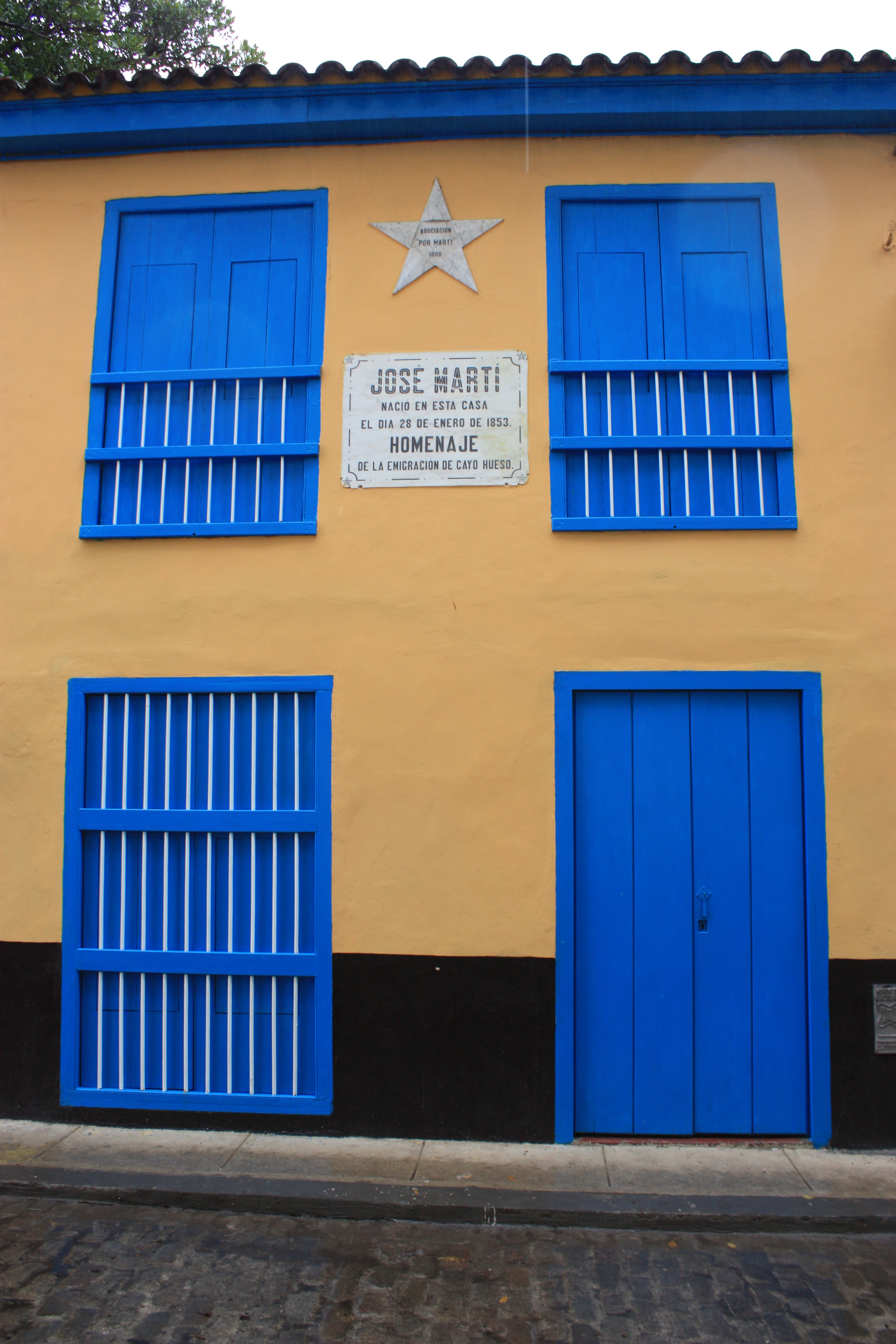
41 Paula Street, Havana, birthplace of José Martí

José Julián Martí Pérez was born on 28 January 1853, in Havana, at 41 Paula Street, to Spanish parents, a Valencian father, Mariano Martí Navarro, and Leonor Pérez Cabrera, a native of the Canary Islands. Martí was the older brother to seven sisters: Leonor, Mariana, María del Carmen, María del Pilar, Rita Amelia, Antonia and Dolores. He was baptized on 12 February in Santo Ángel Custodio church. When he was four, his family moved from Cuba to Valencia, Spain, but two years later they returned to the island where they enrolled José at a local public school, in the Santa Clara neighborhood where his father worked as a prison guard.

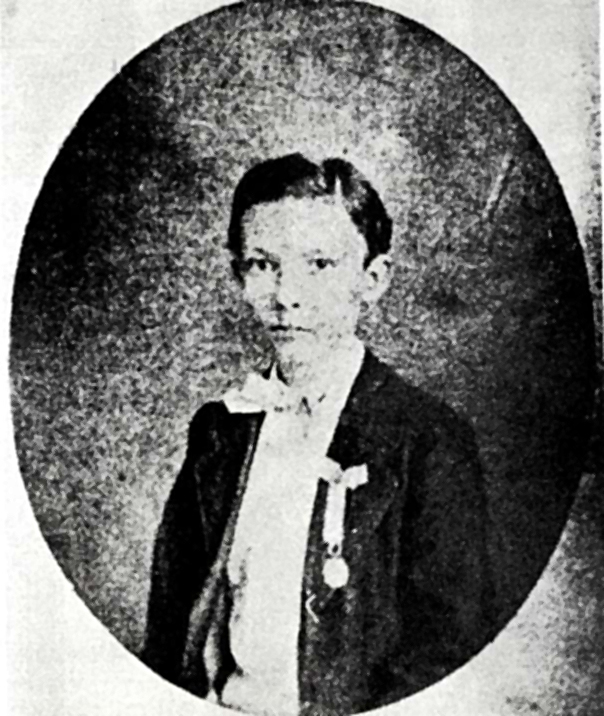
First known portrait of José Martí, during his school years

In 1865, he enrolled in the Escuela de Instrucción Primaria Superior Municipal de Varones that was headed by Rafael María de Mendive. Mendive was influential in the development of Martí's political philosophies. Also instrumental in his development of a social and political conscience was his best friend Fermín Valdés Domínguez, the son of a wealthy slave-owning family. In April the same year, after hearing the news of the assassination of Abraham Lincoln, Martí and other young students expressed their pain—through group mourning—for the death of a man who had signed the Emancipation Proclamation and had a crucial influence in the abolition of slavery in the USA.. In 1866, Martí entered the Instituto de Segunda Enseñanza where Mendive financed his studies.

Martí signed up at the Escuela Profesional de Pintura y Escultura de La Habana (Professional School for Painting and Sculpture of Havana) in September 1867, known as Academia Nacional de Bellas Artes San Alejandro, to take drawing classes. He hoped to flourish in this area but did not find commercial success. In 1867, he also entered the school of San Pablo, established and managed by Mendive, where he enrolled for the second and third years of his bachelor's degree and assisted Mendive with the school's administrative tasks. In April 1868, his poem dedicated to Mendive's wife, A Micaela. En la Muerte de Miguel Ángel appeared in Guanabacoa's newspaper El Álbum.

When the Ten Years' War broke out in Cuba in 1868, clubs of supporters for the Cuban nationalist cause formed all over Cuba, and José and his friend Fermín joined them. Martí had a precocious desire for the independence and freedom of Cuba. He started writing poems about this vision, while, at the same time, trying to do something to achieve this dream. In 1869, he published his first political writings in the only edition of the newspaper El Diablo Cojuelo, published by Fermín Valdés Domínguez. That same year he published "Abdala", a patriotic drama in verse form in the one-volume La Patria Libre newspaper, which he published himself. "Abdala" is about a fictional country called Nubia which struggles for liberation. His sonnet "10 de Octubre", later to become one of his most famous poems, was also written during that year, and was published later in his school newspaper.

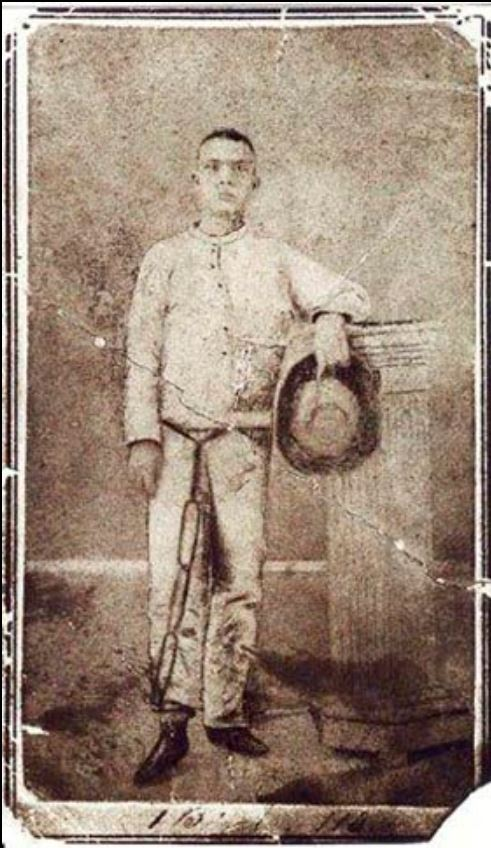
Martí in forced labor in the quarry of San Lazaro

In March of that year, colonial authorities shut down the school, interrupting Martí's studies. He came to resent Spanish rule of his homeland at an early age; likewise, he developed a hatred of slavery, which was still practiced in Cuba.

On 21 October 1869, aged 16, he was arrested and incarcerated in the national jail, following an accusation of treason and bribery from the Spanish government upon the discovery of a "reproving" letter, which Martí and Fermín had written to a friend when the friend joined the Spanish army. More than four months later, Martí confessed to the charges and was condemned to six years in prison. His mother tried to free her son (who at 16 was still a minor) by writing letters to the government, and his father went to a lawyer friend for legal support, but these efforts failed. Eventually, Martí fell ill; his legs were severely lacerated by the chains that bound him. As a result, he was transferred to another part of Cuba known as Isla de Pinos instead of further imprisonment. Following that, the Spanish authorities decided to exile him to Spain. In Spain, Martí, who was 18 at the time, was allowed to continue his studies with the hopes that studying in Spain would renew his loyalty to Spain.

=== Spain: 1871–74 ===
In January 1871, Martí embarked on the steam ship Guipuzcoa, which took him from Havana to Cádiz. He settled in Madrid in a guesthouse in Desengaño St. #10. Arriving at the capital he contacted fellow Cuban Carlos Sauvalle, who had been deported to Spain a year before Martí and whose house served as a center of reunions for Cubans in exile. On 24 March, Cádiz's newspaper La Soberania Nacional, published Martí's article "Castillo" in which he recalled the sufferings of a friend he met in prison. This article would be reprinted in Sevilla's La Cuestión Cubana and New York's La República. At this time, Martí registered himself as a member of independent studies in the law faculty of the Central University of Madrid. While studying here, Martí openly participated in discourse on the Cuban issue, debating through the Spanish press and circulating documents protesting Spanish activities in Cuba.

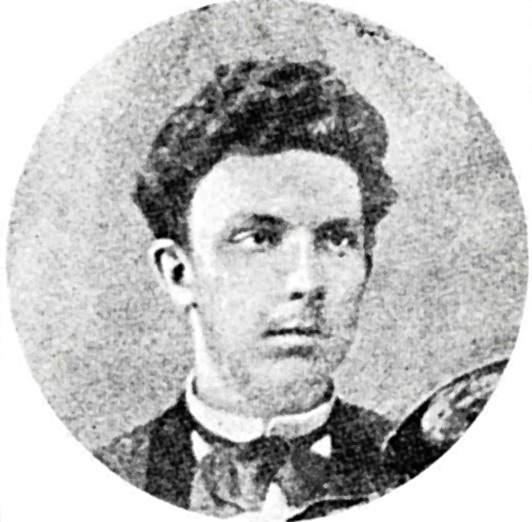
Martí in Madrid, 1871

Martí's maltreatment at the hands of the Spaniards and consequent deportation to Spain in 1871 inspired a tract, Political Imprisonment in Cuba, published in July. This pamphlet's purpose was to move the Spanish public to do something about its government's brutalities in Cuba and promoted the issue of Cuban independence. In September, from the pages of El Jurado Federal, Martí and Sauvalle accused the newspaper La Prensa of having calumniated the Cuban residents in Madrid. During his stay in Madrid, Martí frequented the Ateneo and the National Library, the Café de los Artistas, and the British, Swiss and Iberian breweries. In November he became sick and had an operation, paid for by Sauvalle.

On 27 November 1871, eight medical students, who had been accused (without evidence) of the desecration of a Spanish grave, were executed in Havana. In June 1872, Fermín Valdés was arrested because of the 27 November incident. His sentence of six years of jail was pardoned, and he was exiled to Spain where he reunited with Martí. On 27 November 1872, the printed matter Dia 27 de Noviembre de 1871 (27 November 1871) written by Martí and signed by Fermín Valdés Domínguez and Pedro J. de la Torre circulated Madrid. A group of Cubans held a funeral in the Caballero de Gracia church, the first anniversary of the medical students' execution.

In 1873, Martí's "A mis Hermanos Muertos el 27 de Noviembre" was published by Fermín Valdés. In February, for the first time, the Cuban flag appeared in Madrid, hanging from Martí's balcony in Concepción Jerónima, where he lived for a few years. In the same month, the Proclamation of the First Spanish Republic by the Cortes on 11 February 1873, reaffirmed Cuba as inseparable to Spain, Martí responded with an essay, The Spanish Republic and the Cuban Revolution, and sent it to the Prime Minister, pointing out that this new freely elected body of deputies that had proclaimed a republic based on democracy had been hypocritical not to grant Cuba its independence. He sent examples of his work to Nestor Ponce de Leon, a member of the Junta Central Revolucionaria de Nueva York (Central revolutionary committee of New York), to whom he would express his will to collaborate on the fight for the independence of Cuba.

In May, he moved to Zaragoza, accompanied by Fermín Valdés to continue his studies in law at the Universidad Literaria. The newspaper La Cuestión Cubana of Sevilla, published numerous articles from Martí.

In June 1874, Martí graduated with a degree in Civil Law and Canon Law. In August he signed up as an external student at the Facultad de Filosofia y Letras de Zaragoza, where he finished his degree by October. In November he returned to Madrid and then left to Paris. There he met Auguste Vacquerie, a poet, and Victor Hugo. In December 1874 he embarked from Le Havre for Mexico. Prevented from returning to Cuba, Martí went instead to Mexico and Guatemala. During these travels, he taught and wrote, advocating continuously for Cuba's independence.

=== México and Guatemala: 1875–78 ===
In 1875, Martí lived on Calle Moneda in Mexico City near the Zócalo, a prestigious address of the time. One floor above him lived Manuel Antonio Mercado, Secretary of the Distrito Federal, who became one of Martí's best friends. On 2 March 1875, he published his first article for Vicente Villada's Revista Universal, a broadsheet discussing politics, literature, and general business commerce. On 12 March, his Spanish translation of Hugo's Mes Fils (1874) began serialization in Revista Universal. Martí then joined the editorial staff, editing the Boletín section of the publication.

In these writings, he expressed his opinions about current events in Mexico. On 27 May, in the newspaper Revista Universal, he responded to the anti-Cuban-independence arguments in La Colonia Española, a newspaper for Spanish citizens living in Mexico. In December, Sociedad Gorostiza (Gorostiza Society), a group of writers and artists, accepted Martí as a member, where he met his future wife, María del Carmen Zayas-Bazán e Hidalgo, during his frequent visits to her Cuban father's house to meet with the Gorostiza group.

On 1 January 1876, in Oaxaca, elements opposed to Sebastián Lerdo de Tejada's government, led by Gen. Porfirio Díaz, proclaimed the Plan de Tuxtepec, which instigated a bloody civil war. Martí and Mexican colleagues established the Sociedad Alarcón, composed of dramatists, actors, and critics. At this point, Martí began collaborating with the newspaper El Socialista as leader of the Gran Círculo Obrero (Great Labor Circle) organization of liberals and reformists who supported Lerdo de Tejada. In March, the newspaper proposed a series of candidates as delegates, including Martí, to the first Congreso Obrero, or congress of the workers. On 4 June, La Sociedad Esperanza de Empleados (Employees' Hope Society) designated Martí as delegate to the Congreso Obrero. On 7 December, Martí published his article Alea Jacta Est in the newspaper El Federalista, bitterly criticizing the Porfiristas' armed assault upon the constitutional government in place. On 16 December, he published the article "Extranjero" (foreigner; abroad), in which he repeated his denunciation of the Porfiristas and bade farewell to Mexico.

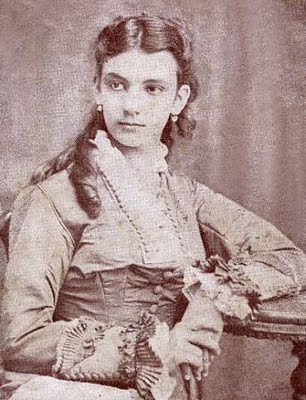
María García Granados y Saborío

In 1877, using his second name and second surname Julián Pérez as pseudonym, Martí embarked for Havana, hoping to arrange to move his family away to Mexico City from Havana. He returned to Mexico, however, entering at the port of Progreso from which, via Isla de Mujeres and Belize, he travelled south to progressive Guatemala City. He took residence in the prosperous suburb of Ciudad Vieja, home of Guatemala's artists and intelligentsia of the day, on Cuarta Avenida (Fourth Avenue), 3 km south of Guatemala City. While there, he was commissioned by the government to write the play Patria y Libertad (Drama Indio) (Country and Liberty (an Indian Drama)). He personally met the president, Justo Rufino Barrios, about this project. On 22 April, the newspaper El Progreso published his article "Los códigos Nuevos" (The New Laws) pertaining to the then newly enacted Civil Code. On 29 May, he was appointed head of the Department of French, English, Italian and German Literature, History and Philosophy, on the faculty of philosophy and arts of the Universidad Nacional. On 25 July, he lectured for the opening evening of the literary society 'Sociedad Literaria El Porvenir', at the Teatro Colón (the since-renamed Teatro Nacional), at which function he was appointed vice-president of the Society, and acquiring the moniker "el doctor torrente," or Doctor Torrent, in view of his rhetorical style. Martí taught composition classes free at the Academia de Niñas de Centroamérica girls' academy, among whose students he enthralled young María García Granados y Saborío, daughter of Guatemalan president Miguel García Granados. The schoolgirl's crush was unrequited, however, as he went again to México, where he met María del Carmen Zayas-Bazán e Hidalgo and whom he later married.

In 1878, Martí returned to Guatemala and published his book Guatemala, edited in Mexico. On 10 May, socialite María García Granados died of lung disease; her unrequited love for Martí branded her, poignantly, as 'la niña de Guatemala, la que se murió de amor' (the Guatemalan girl who died of love). Following her death, Martí returned to Cuba. There, he resigned signing the Pact of Zanjón which ended the Cuban Ten Years' War, but had no effect on Cuba's status as a colony. He met Afro-Cuban revolutionary Juan Gualberto Gómez, who would be his lifelong partner in the independence struggle and a stalwart defender of his legacy during this same journey. He married Carmen Zayas Bazán on Havana's Calle Tulipán Street at this time. In October, his application to practice law in Cuba was refused, and thereafter he immersed himself in radical efforts, such as for the Comité Revolucionario Cubano de Nueva York (Cuban Revolutionary Committee of New York). On 22 November 1878, his son José Francisco, known fondly as "Pepito", was born.

=== United States and Venezuela: 1880–90 ===
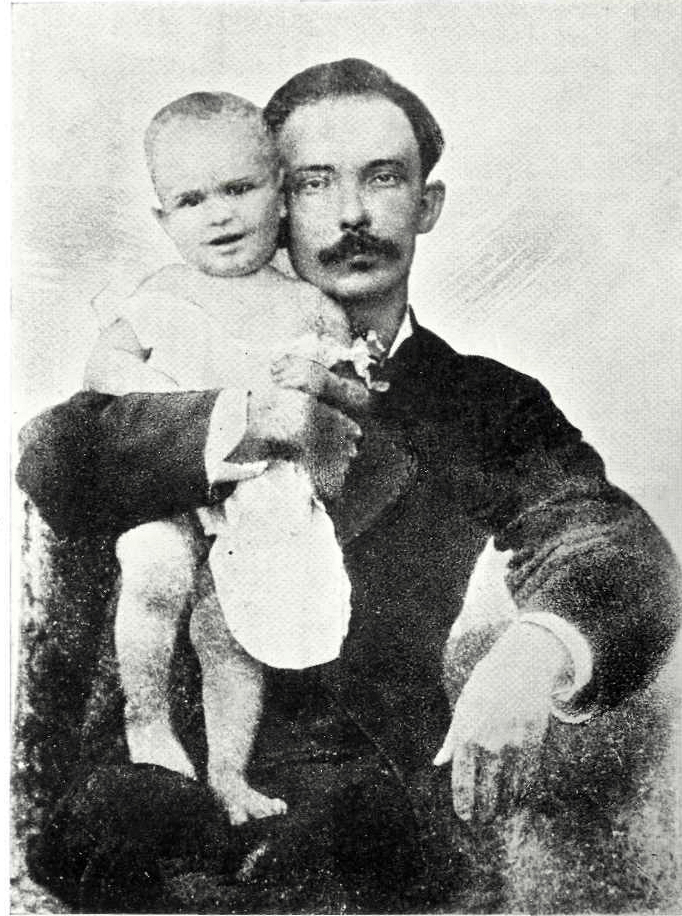
Martí with his son, José Francisco, in New York, 1880

In 1881, after a brief stay in New York, Martí travelled to Venezuela and founded in Caracas the Revista Venezolana, or Venezuelan Review. The journal incurred the wrath of Venezuela's dictator, Antonio Guzmán Blanco, and Martí was forced to return to New York. There, Martí joined General Calixto García's Cuban revolutionary committee, composed of Cuban exiles advocating independence. Here Martí openly supported Cuba's struggle for liberation, and worked as a journalist for La Nación of Buenos Aires and for several Central American journals, especially La Opinion Liberal in Mexico City. The article "El ajusticiamiento de Guiteau," an account of President Garfield's murderer's trial, was published in La Opinion Liberal in 1881, and later selected for inclusion in The Library of America's anthology of American True Crime writing. In addition, Martí wrote poems and translated novels to Spanish. He worked for Appleton and Company and, "on his own, translated and published Helen Hunt Jackson's Ramona. His repertory of original work included plays, a novel, poetry, a children's magazine, La Edad de Oro, and a newspaper, Patria, which became the official organ of the Cuban Revolutionary party". He also served as a consul for Uruguay, Argentina, and Paraguay. Throughout this work, he preached the "freedom of Cuba with an enthusiasm that swelled the ranks of those eager to strive with him for it".

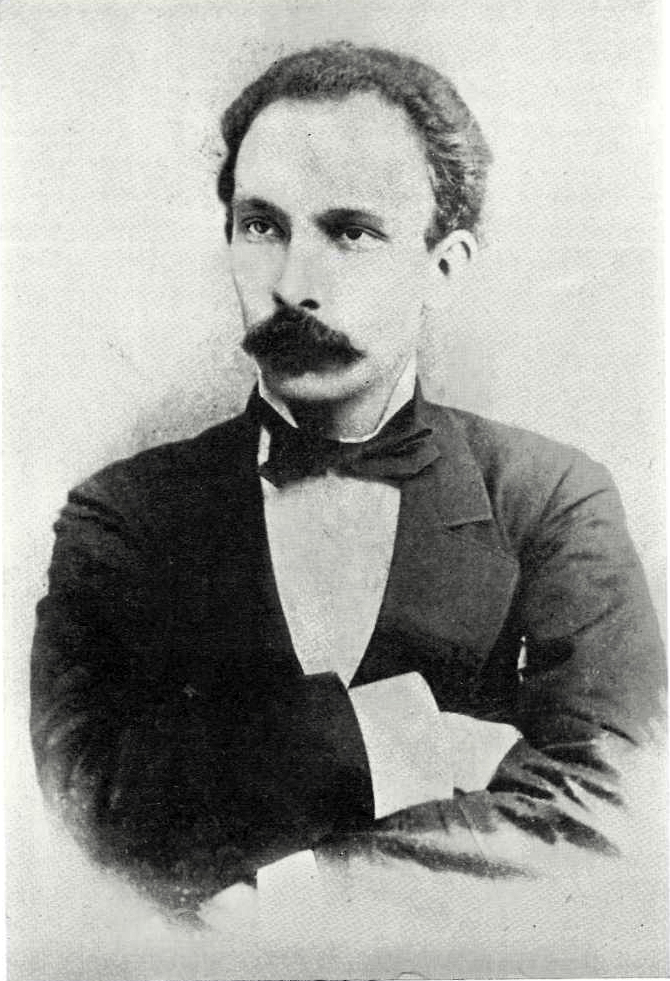
Martí in New York, 1885

Tension existed within the Cuban revolutionary committee between Martí and his military compatriots. Martí feared a military dictatorship would be established in Cuba upon independence, and suspected Dominican-born General Máximo Gómez of having these intentions. Martí knew that the independence of Cuba needed time and careful planning. Ultimately, Martí refused to cooperate with Máximo Gómez and Antonio Maceo Grajales, two Cuban military leaders from the Ten Years' War, when they wanted to invade immediately in 1884. Martí knew that it was too early to attempt to win back Cuba, and later events proved him right.

=== United States, Central America and the West Indies: 1891–94 ===
On 1 January 1891, Martí's essay "Nuestra América" was published in New York's Revista Ilustrada, and on the 30th of that month in Mexico's El Partido Liberal. He actively participated in the Conferencia Monetaria Internacional (The International Monetary Conference) in New York during that time as well. On 30 June his wife and son arrived in New York. After a short time, during which Carmen Zayas Bazán realized that Martí's dedication to Cuban independence surpassed that of supporting his family, she returned to Havana with her son on 27 August. Martí would never see them again. The fact that his wife never shared the convictions central to his life was an enormous personal tragedy for Martí. He turned for solace to Carmen Miyares de Mantilla, a Venezuelan who ran a boarding house in New York, and he is presumed to be the father of her daughter María Mantilla, who was in turn the mother of the actor Cesar Romero, who proudly claimed to be Martí's grandson. In September Martí became sick again. He intervened in the commemorative acts of The Independents, causing the Spanish consul in New York to complain to the Argentine and Uruguayan governments. Consequently, Martí resigned from the Argentinean, Paraguayan, and Uruguayan consulates. In October he published his book Versos Sencillos.

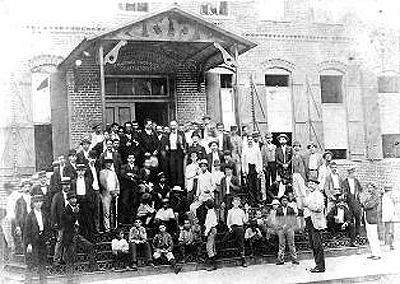
José Martí (center) poses with workers at the Ybor Factory Building in Ybor City, Tampa, Florida

On 26 November he was invited by the Club Ignacio Agramonte, an organization founded by Cuban immigrants in Ybor City, Tampa, Florida, to a celebration to collect funding for the cause of Cuban independence. There he gave a lecture known as "Con Todos, y para el Bien de Todos", which was reprinted in Spanish language newspapers and periodicals across the United States. The following night, another lecture, " Los Pinos Nuevos", was given by Martí in another Tampa gathering in honor of the medical students killed in Cuba in 1871. In November artist Herman Norman painted a portrait of José Martí.

On 5 January 1892, Martí participated in a reunion of the emigration representatives, in Cayo Hueso (Key West), the Cuban community where the Bases del Partido Revolucionario (Basis of the Cuban Revolutionary Party) was passed. He began the process of organizing the newly formed party. To raise support and collect funding for the independence movement, he visited tobacco factories, where he gave speeches to the workers and united them in the cause. In March 1892 the first edition of the Patria newspaper, related to the Cuban Revolutionary Party, was published, funded and directed by Martí. During Martí's Key West years, his secretary was Dolores Castellanos (1870–1948), a Cuban-American woman born in Key West, who also served as president of the Protectoras de la Patria: Club Político de Cubanas, a Cuban women's political club in support of Martí's cause, and for whom Martí wrote a poem titled "A Dolores Castellanos." On 8 April, he was elected delegate of the Cuban Revolutionary Party by the Cayo Hueso Club in Tampa and New York.

From July to September 1892 he traveled through Florida, Washington, D.C., Philadelphia, Baltimore, Haiti, the Dominican Republic and Jamaica on an organization mission among the exiled Cubans. On this mission, Martí made numerous speeches and visited various tobacco factories. On December 16 he was poisoned in Tampa.

In 1893, Martí traveled through the United States, Central America and the West Indies, visiting different Cuban clubs. His visits were received with a growing enthusiasm and raised badly needed funds for the revolutionary cause. On 24 May he met Rubén Darío, the Nicaraguan poet in a theatre act in Hardman Hall, New York City. On 3 June he had an interview with Máximo Gómez in Montecristi, Dominican Republic, where they planned the uprising. In July he met with General Antonio Maceo Grajales in San José, Costa Rica.

In 1894 he continued traveling for propagation and organizing the revolutionary movement. On 27 January he published "A Cuba!" in the newspaper Patria where he denounced collusion between the Spanish and American interests. In July he visited the president of the Mexican Republic, Porfirio Díaz, and travelled to Veracruz. In August he prepared and arranged the armed expedition that would begin the Cuban revolution.

=== Return to Cuba: 1895 ===
On 12 January 1895, the North American authorities stopped the steamship Lagonda and two other suspicious ships, Amadis and Baracoa, at the port of Fernandina in Florida, confiscating weapons and ruining Plan de Fernandina (Fernandina Plan). On 29 January, Martí drew up the order of the uprising, signing it with general Jose Maria Rodriguez and Enrique Collazo. Juan Gualberto Gómez was assigned to orchestrate war preparations for La Habana Province, and was able to work right under the noses of the relatively unconcerned Spanish authorities. Martí decided to move to Montecristi, Dominican Republic to join Máximo Gómez and to plan out the uprising.

The uprising finally took place on 24 February 1895. A month later, Martí and Máximo Gómez declared the Manifesto de Montecristi, an "exposition of the purposes and principles of the Cuban revolution". Martí had persuaded Gómez to lead an expedition into Cuba.

Before leaving for Cuba, Martí wrote his "literary will" on 1 April 1895, leaving his personal papers and manuscripts to Gonzalo de Quesada, with instructions for editing. Knowing that the majority of his writing in newspapers in Honduras, Uruguay, and Chile would disappear over time, Martí instructed Quesada to arrange his papers in volumes. The volumes were to be arranged in the following way: volumes one and two, North Americas; volume three, Hispanic Americas; volume four, North American Scenes; volume five, Books about the Americas (this included both North and South America); volume six, Literature, education and painting. Another volume included his poetry.

The expedition, composed of Martí, Gómez, Ángel Guerra, Francisco Borreo, Cesar Salas and Marcos del Rosario, left Montecristi for Cuba on 1 April 1895. Despite delays and desertion by some members, they got to Cuba, landing at Playitas, near Cape Maisí and Imías, Cuba, on 11 April. Once there, they made contact with the Cuban rebels, who were headed by the Maceo brothers, and started fighting against Spanish troops. The revolt did not go as planned, "mainly because the call to revolution received no immediate, spontaneous support from the masses." By 13 May, the expedition reached Dos Rios. On 19 May, Gomez faced Ximenez de Sandoval's troops and ordered Martí to stay with the rearguard, but Martí became separated from the bulk of the Cuban forces, and entered the Spanish line.

=== Death ===
Death of José Martí in the battle of Dos Ríos, 1895

Martí was killed in battle against Spanish troops at the Battle of Dos Ríos, near the confluence of the rivers Contramaestre and Cauto, on 19 May 1895. Gómez had recognized that the Spaniards had a strong position between palm trees, so he ordered his men to disengage. Martí was alone and seeing a young courier ride by said, "Joven, ¡a la carga!" ('Young man, charge!') This was around midday, and he was dressed in a black jacket while riding a white horse, which made him an easy target for the Spanish. After Martí was shot, the young trooper, Ángel de la Guardia, lost his horse and returned to report the loss. The Spanish took possession of the body, buried it close by, then exhumed the body upon realization of its identity. He was buried in Santa Ifigenia Cemetery in Santiago de Cuba.

The death of Martí was a blow to the "aspirations of the Cuban rebels, inside and outside of the island, but the fighting continued with alternating successes and failures until the entry of the United States into the war in 1898".

== Political ideology ==
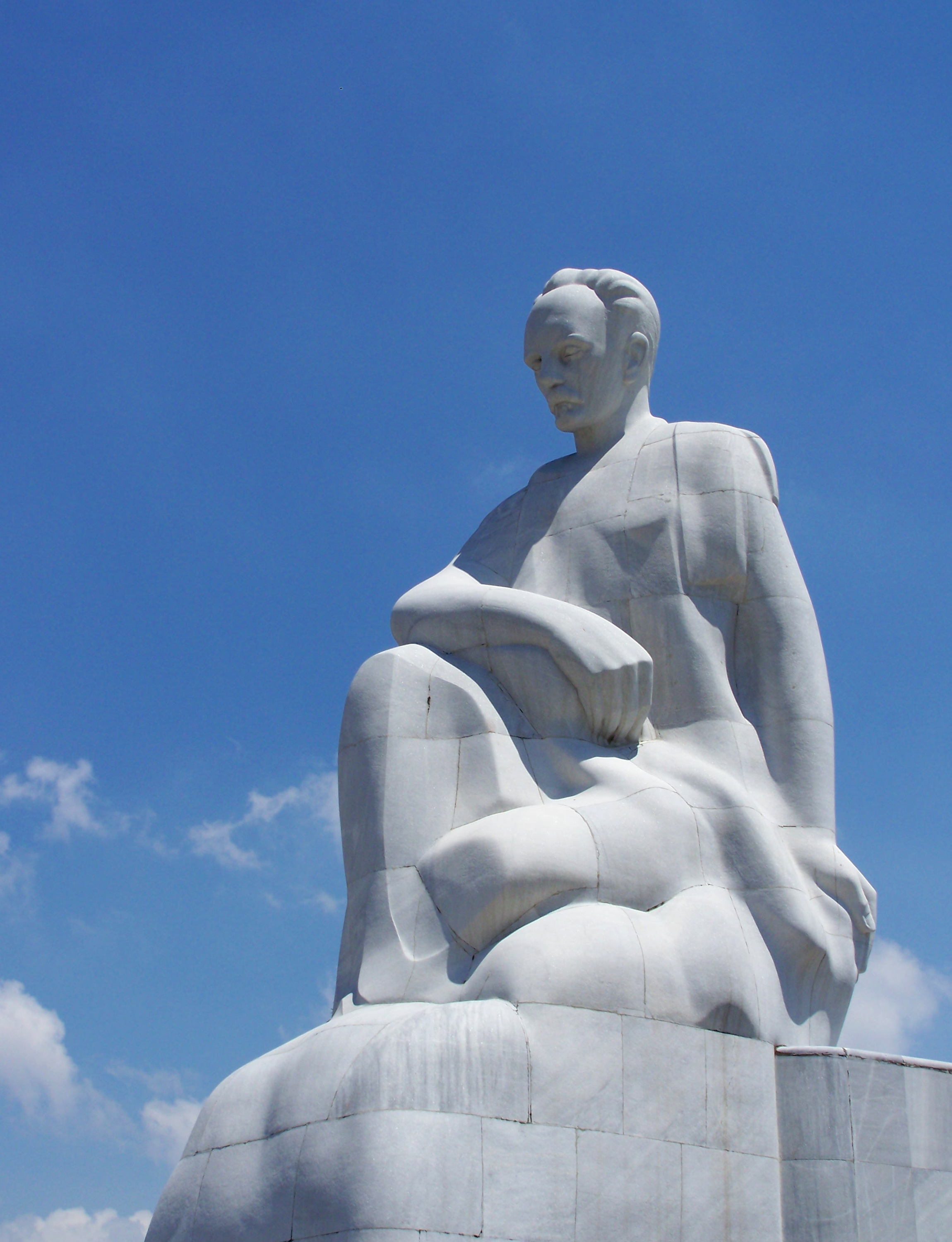
Statue of José Martí in Havana, Cuba

=== Liberalism ===
Martí's political ideas were shaped by his early encounter with Krausist liberalism and its defense of spirituality and solidarity. Radical liberalism in Latin America during this time period often took on a nationalist and anti-imperialist cast, as shown by the examples of Francisco Bilbao in Chile, Benito Juárez in Mexico, José Santos Zelaya in Nicaragua, and Ramón Emeterio Betances in Puerto Rico, whom Martí deeply admired and considered one of his teachers. An increasingly radicalized liberalism emphasizing democratic participation, economic equality, national sovereignty, and supplemented by his exposure to doctrines such as Georgism, remained the dominant basis of Martí's outlook.

=== Cuban independence ===
Martí wrote extensively about Spanish colonial control and the threat of US expansionism into Cuba. To him, it was unnatural that Cuba was controlled and oppressed by the Spanish government, when it had its own unique identity and culture. In his pamphlet from 11 February 1873, called "The Spanish Republic and the Cuban Revolution", he argued that "Cubans do not live as Spaniards live.... They are nourished by a different system of trade, have links with different countries, and express their happiness through quite contrary customs. There are no common aspirations or identical goals linking the two peoples, or beloved memories to unite them. ... Peoples are only united by ties of fraternity and love."

=== Slavery ===
Martí opposed slavery and criticized Spain for upholding it. In a speech to Cuban immigrants in Steck Hall, New York, on 24 January 1879, he stated that the war against Spain needed to be fought, recalled the heroism and suffering of the Ten Years' War, which, he declared, had qualified Cuba as a real nation with a right to independence. Spain had not ratified the conditions of the peace treaty, had falsified elections, continued excessive taxation, and had failed to abolish slavery. Cuba needed to be free.

=== Revolutionary tactics ===
Martí proposed in a letter to Máximo Gómez in 1882 the formation of a revolutionary party, which he considered essential in the prevention of Cuba falling back on the Home Rule Party (Partido Autonomista) after the Pact of Zanjón. The Home Rule Party was a peace-seeking party that would stop short of the outright independence that Martí thought Cuba needed. But he was aware that there were social divisions in Cuba, especially racial divisions, that needed to be addressed as well. He thought war was necessary to achieve Cuba's freedom, despite his basic ideology of conciliation, respect, dignity, and balance. The establishment of the patria (fatherland) with a good government would unite Cubans of all social classes and colours in harmony. Together with other Cubans resident in New York, Martí started laying the grounds for the Revolutionary Party, stressing the need for a democratic organization as the basic structure before any military leaders were to join. The military would have to subordinate themselves to the interests of the fatherland. Gómez later rejoined Martí's plans, promising to comply.

Martí's consolidation of support among the Cuban expatriates, especially in Florida, was key in the planning and execution of the invasion of Cuba. His speeches to Cuban tobacco workers in Tampa and Key West motivated and united them; this is considered the most important political achievement of his life. At this point he refined his ideological platform, basing it on a Cuba held together by pride in being Cuban, a society that ensured "the welfare and prosperity of all Cubans" independently of class, occupation or race. Faith in the cause could not die, and the military would not try for domination. All pro-independence Cubans would participate, with no sector predominating. From this he established the Cuban Revolutionary Party in early 1892.

Martí and the CRP were devoted to secretly organizing the anti-Spanish war. Martí's newspaper, Patria, was a key instrument of this campaign, where Martí delineated his final plans for Cuba. Through this medium he argued against the exploitative colonialism of Spain in Cuba, criticized the Home Rule (Autonomista) Party for having aims that fell considerably short of full independence, and warned against U.S. annexationism which he felt could only be prevented by Cuba's successful independence. He specified his plans for the future Cuban Republic, a multi-class and multi-racial democratic republic based on universal suffrage, with an egalitarian economic base to develop fully Cuba's productive resources and an equitable distribution of land among citizens, with enlightened and virtuous politicians.

From Martí's 'Campaign Diaries', written during the final expedition in Cuba, it seems evident that Martí would have reached the highest position in the future Republic of Arms. This was not to be; his death occurred before the Assembly of Cuba was set up. Until his last minute, Martí dedicated his life to achieve full independence for Cuba. His uncompromising belief in democracy and freedom for his fatherland is what characterized his political ideology.

=== United States ===
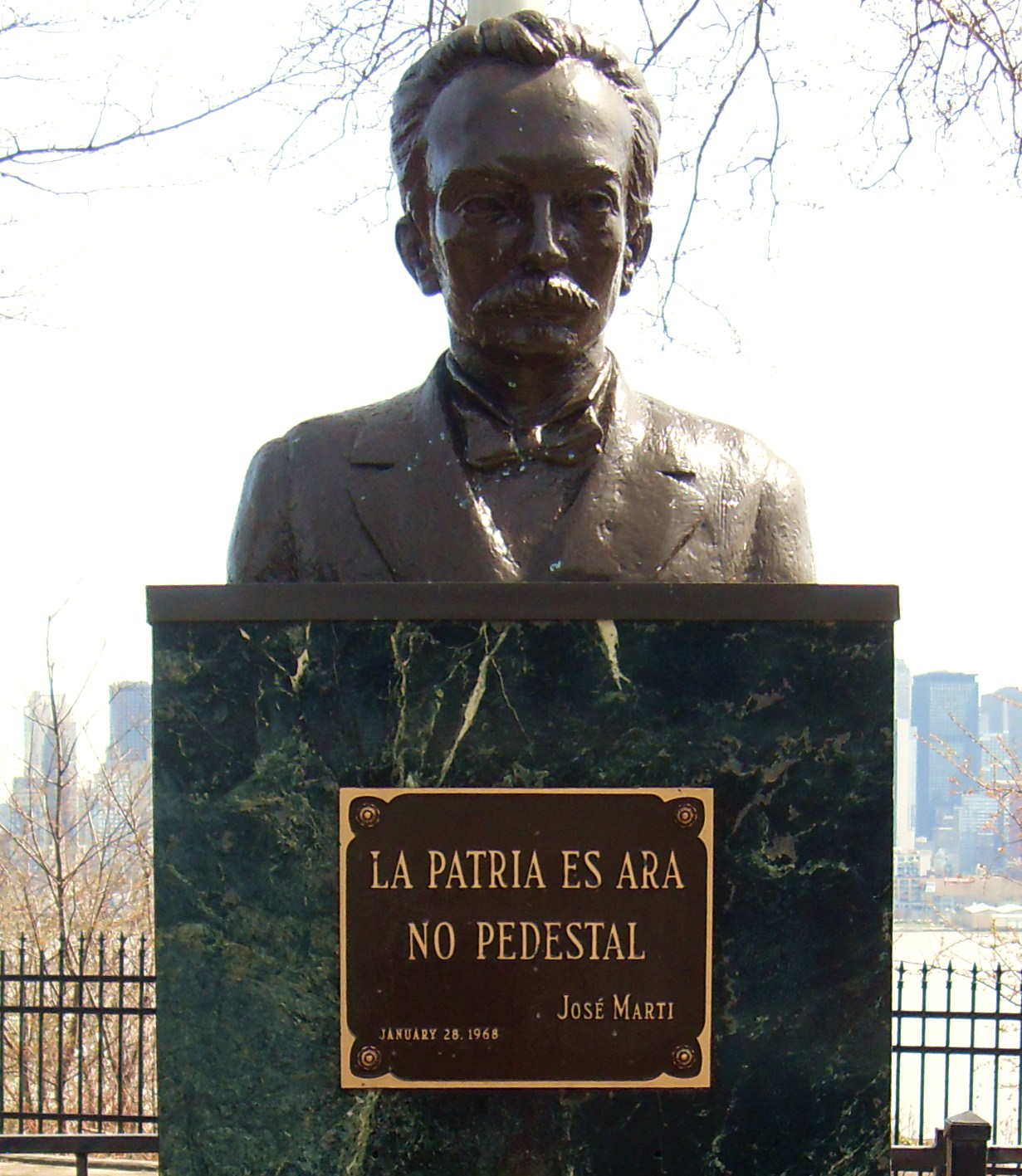
Bust of José Martí in West New York, NJ; LA PATRIA ES ARA, NO PEDESTAL.(lit. 'The homeland is an altar, not a pedestal. ') José Martí

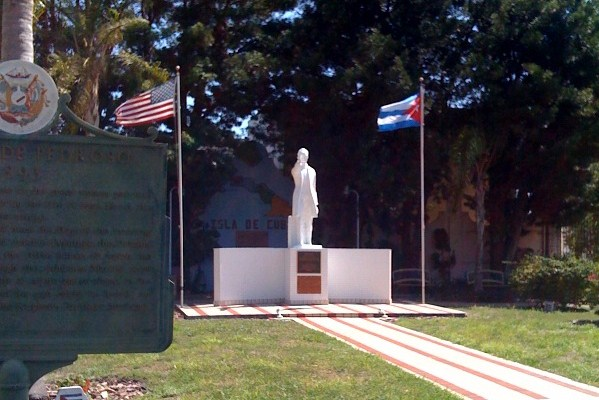
Monument of Jose Martí in Ybor City (Tampa, Florida).

Martí demonstrated an anti-imperialist attitude from an early age, and was convinced that the United States posed a danger for Latin America. While critiquing the United States for its stereotypes of Latin Americans and preoccupation with capitalism, Martí also drew parallels with the American Revolution and the nationalist movement in Cuba. At the same time, he recognized the advantages of the civilizations of Western Europe and the United States, which were open to the reforms that Latin American countries needed in order to detach themselves from the colonial heritage of Spain. Martí's distrust of U.S. politics had developed during the 1880s, due to the intervention threats that loomed on Mexico and Guatemala, and indirectly on Cuba's future. Over time Martí became increasingly alarmed about the United States' intentions for Cuba. The United States desperately needed new markets for its industrial products because of the economic crisis it was experiencing, and the media was talking about the purchase of Cuba from Spain. Cuba was a profitable, fertile country with an important strategic position in the Gulf of Mexico. Martí felt that the interests of Cuba's future lay with its sister nations in Latin America, and were opposite to those of the United States.

Another trait that Martí admired was the work ethic that characterized U.S. society. On various occasions Martí conveyed his deep admiration for the immigrant-based society, "whose principal aspiration he interpreted as being to construct a truly modern country, based upon hard work and progressive ideas." Martí stated that he was "never surprised in any country of the world [he had] visited. Here [he] was surprised... [he] remarked that no one stood quietly on the corners, no door was shut an instant, no man was quiet. [He] stopped [him]self, [he] looked respectfully on this people, and [he] said goodbye forever to that lazy life and poetical inutility of our European countries".

Although Martí opposed US intervention in Cuba, he found American society to be so great that he believed Latin America should consider imitating the United States. Martí argued that if the US "could reach such a high standard of living in so short a time, and despite, too, its lack of unifying traditions, could not the same be expected of Latin America?" However, Martí believed US expansionism represented Spanish American republics' "greatest danger." Martí was amazed at how education was directed towards helping the development of the nation and once again encouraged Latin American countries to follow the example set by U.S. society. At the same time, he criticized the elitist educational systems of Cuba and the rest of Latin America. Often, Martí recommended countries in Latin America to "send representatives to learn more relevant techniques in the United States". Once this was done, Martí hoped that this representatives would bring a "much-needed modernization to the Latin American agricultural policies".

However, not everything in the United States was to be admired by Martí. When it came to politics Martí wrote that politics in the US had "adopted a carnival atmosphere... especially during election time". He saw acts of corruption among candidates, such as bribing "the constituents with vast quantities of beer, while impressive parades wound their way through New York's crowded streets, past masses of billboards, all exhorting the public to vote for the different political candidates". Martí criticized and condemned the elites of the United States as they "pulled the main political strings behind the scenes". According to Martí, the elites "deserved severe censure" as they were the biggest threat to the "ideals with which the United States was first conceived".

Martí started to believe that the US had abused its potential. Racism was abundant. Different races were being discriminated against; political life "was both cynically regarded by the public at large and widely abused by 'professional politicians'; industrial magnates and powerful labor groups faced each other menacingly". All of this convinced Martí that a large-scale social conflict was imminent in the United States.

On the positive side, Martí was astonished by the "inviolable right of freedom of speech which all U.S. citizens possessed". Martí applauded the United States' Constitution which allowed freedom of speech to all its citizens, no matter what political beliefs they had. In May 1883, while attending political meetings he heard "the call for revolution – and more specifically the destruction of the capitalist system". Martí was amazed that the country maintained freedom of speech even with respect to calls that "could have led to its own destruction". Martí also gave his support to the women's suffrage movements, and was "pleased that women here [took] advantage of this privilege in order to make their voices heard". According to Martí, free speech was essential if any nation was to be civilized and he expressed his "profound admiration for these many basic liberties and opportunities open to the vast majority of U.S. citizens".

The works of Martí contain many comparisons between the ways of life of North and Latin America. The former was seen as "hardy, 'soulless', and, at times, cruel society, but one which, nevertheless, had been based upon a firm foundation of liberty and on a tradition of liberty". Although U.S. society had its flaws, they tended to be "of minor importance when compared to the broad sweep of social inequality, and to the widespread abuse of power prevalent in Latin America".

Once it became apparent that the United States were actually going to purchase Cuba and intended to Americanize it, Martí "spoke out loudly and bravely against such action, stating the opinion of many Cubans on the United States of America."

=== Latin American identity ===
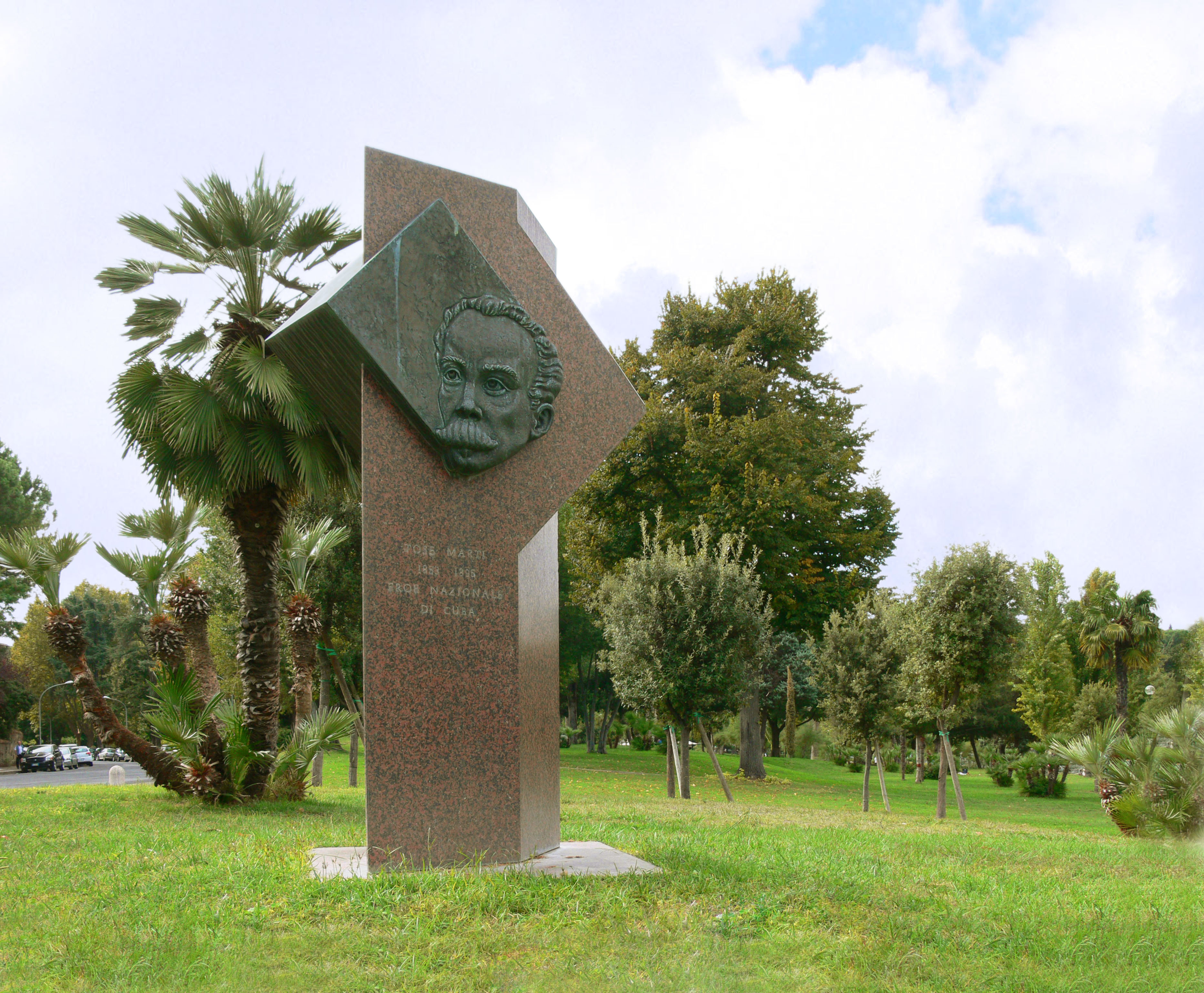
José Martí Monument at Esposizione Universale Roma, Rome

José Martí as a liberator believed that the Latin American countries needed to know the reality of their own history. Martí also saw the necessity of a country having its own literature. These reflections started in Mexico from 1875 and are connected to the Mexican Reform, where prominent liberals like Ignacio Manuel Altamirano and Guillermo Prieto had situated themselves in front of a cultural renovation in Mexico, taking on the same approach as Esteban Echeverría thirty years before in Argentina. In the second "Boletin" that Martí published in the Revista Universal (11 May 1875) one can already see Martí's approach, which was fundamentally Latin American. His wish to build a national or Latin American identity was nothing new or unusual in those days; however, no Latin-American intellectual of that time had approached as clearly as Martí the task of building a national identity. He insisted on the necessity of building institutions and laws that matched the natural elements of each country, and recalled the failure of the applications of French and American civil codes in the new Latin American republics. Martí believed that "el hombre del sur", the man of the South, should choose an appropriate development strategy matching his character, the peculiarity of his culture and history, and the nature that determined his being.

== Writings ==
Martí as a writer covered a range of genres. In addition to producing newspaper articles and keeping up an extensive correspondence (his letters are included in the collection of his complete works), he wrote a serialized novel, composed poetry, wrote essays, and published four issues of a children's magazine, La Edad de Oro(The Golden Age, 1889). His essays and articles occupy more than fifty volumes of his complete works. His prose was extensively read and influenced the modernist generation, especially the Nicaraguan poet Rubén Darío, whom Martí called "my son" when they met in New York in 1893.

Martí did not publish any books: only two notebooks (Cuadernos) of verses, in editions outside of the market, and a number of political tracts. The rest (an enormous amount) was left dispersed in numerous newspapers and magazines, in letters, in diaries and personal notes, in other unedited texts, in frequently improvised speeches, and some lost forever. Five years after his death, the first volume of his Obras was published. A novel appeared in this collection in 1911: Amistad funesta, which Martí had made known was published under a pseudonym in 1885. In 1913, also in this edition, his third poetic collection that he had kept unedited: Versos Libres. His Diario de Campaña (Campaign Diary) was published in 1941. Later still, in 1980, Nicaraguan poet Ernesto Mejía Sánchez produced a set of about thirty of Martí's articles written for the Mexican newspaper El Partido Liberal that weren't included in any of his so-called Obras Completas editions. From 1882 to 1891, Martí collaborated in La Nación, a Buenos Aires newspaper. His texts from La Nación have been collected in Anuario del centro de Estudios Martíanos.

Over the course of his journalistic career, he wrote for numerous newspapers, starting with El Diablo Cojuelo (The Limping Devil) and La Patria Libre (The Free Fatherland), both of which he helped to found in 1869 in Cuba and which established the extent of his political commitment and vision for Cuba. In Spain he wrote for La Colonia Española, in Mexico for La Revista Universal, and in Venezuela for Revista Venezolana, which he founded. In New York he contributed to Venezuelan periodical La Opinión Nacional, Buenos Aires newspaper La Nación, Mexico's La Opinion Liberal, and The Hour from the U.S.

The first critical edition of Martí's complete works began to appear in 1983 in José Martí: Obras completas. Edición crítica. The critical edition of his complete poems was published in 1985 in José Martí: Poesía completa. Edición critica.

Volume two of his Obras Completas includes his famous essay 'Nuestra América' which "comprises a variety of subjects relating to Spanish America about which Martí studied and wrote. Here it is noted that after Cuba his interest was directed mostly to Guatemala, Mexico and Venezuela. The various sections of this part are about general matters and international conferences; economic, social and political questions; literature and art; agrarian and industrial problems; immigration; education; relations with the United States and Spanish America; travel notes".

According to Martí, the intention behind the publication of "La edad de oro" was "so that American children may know how people used to live, and how they live nowadays, in the United States and in other countries; how many things are made, such as glass and iron, steam engines and suspension bridges and electric light; so that when a child sees a coloured stone he will know why the stone is coloured. ... We shall tell them about everything which is done in factories, where things happen which are stranger and more interesting than the magic in fairy stories. These things are real magic, more marvelous than any. ... We write for children because it is they who know how to love, because it is children who are the hope for the world".

Martí's "Versos Sencillos" was written "in the town of Haines Falls, New York, where his doctor has sent [him] to regain his strength 'where streams flowed and clouds gathered in upon themselves'". The poetry encountered in this work is "in many [ways] autobiographical and allows readers to see Martí the man and the patriot and to judge what was important to him at a crucial time in Cuban history".

Martí's writings reflected his own views both socially and politically. "Cultivo Una Rosa Blanca" is one of his poems that emphasize his views in hopes of betterment for society:

I cultivate a white rose
In July as in January
For the sincere friend
Who gives me his hand frankly
And for the cruel person who tears
out the heart with which I live,
I cultivate neither nettles nor thorns:
I cultivate a white rose

This poem is a clear description of Martí's societal hopes for his homeland. Within the poem, he talks about how regardless of the person, whether kind or cruel he cultivates a white rose, meaning that he remains peaceful. This coincides with his ideology about establishing unity amongst the people, more so those of Cuba, through a common identity, with no regards to ethnic and racial differences. This doctrine could be accomplished if one treated his enemy with peace as he would treat a friend. The kindness of one person should be shared with all people, regardless of personal conflict. By following the moral that lies within "Cultivo Rosa Blanca", Martí's vision of Cuban solidarity could be possible, creating a more peaceful society that would emanate through future generations.

After his breakthrough in Cuba literature, José Martí went on to contribute his works to newspapers, magazines, and books that reflected his political and social views. Because of his early death, Martí was unable to publish a vast collection of poetry; even so, his literary contributions have made him a renowned figure in literature, influencing many writers, and people in general, to aspire to follow in the footsteps of Martí.

=== Style ===
Martí's style of writing is difficult to categorize. He used many aphorisms—short, memorable lines that convey truth and/or wisdom—and long complex sentences. He is considered a major contributor to the Spanish American literary movement known as Modernismo and has been linked to Latin American consciousness of the modern age and modernity. His chronicles combined elements of literary portraiture, dramatic narration, and a dioramic scope. His poetry contained "fresh and astonishing images along with deceptively simple sentiments". As an orator (for he made many speeches) he was known for his cascading structure, powerful aphorisms, and detailed descriptions. More important than his style is how he uses that style to put into service his ideas, making "advanced" convincing notions. Throughout his writing he made reference to historical figures and events, and used constant allusions to literature, current news and cultural matters. For this reason, he may be difficult to read and translate.

Martí founded the children's magazine La Edad de Oro in 1889. It included the essay “Tres héroes”, about Simón Bolívar, Miguel Hidalgo and José de San Martín. The piece is an example of Martí adapting his language and presentation for a young audience.

=== Translation ===
José Martí is recognized as a poet, patriot, and figure of Cuban Independence, and he was also a translator. Although he translated literary material out of personal interest, much of his translating work was done for financial reasons during his years of exile in the United States. Martí learned English at an early age and began translating at thirteen. He continued translating throughout his life, including during his time as a student in Spain, with a significant amount of his output occurring during his stay in New York from 1880 until his return to Cuba in 1895.

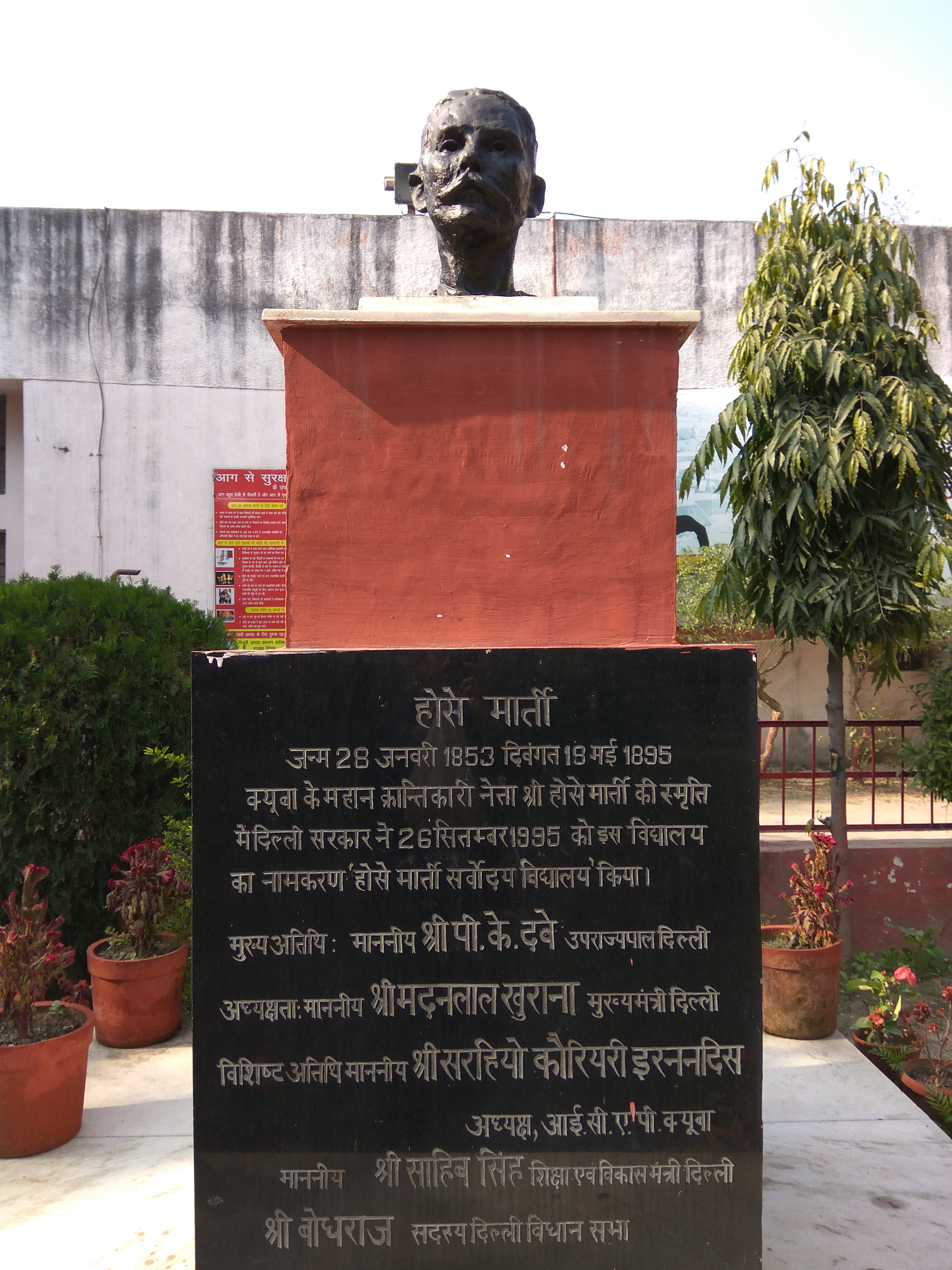
Statue of Jose Martí in a government school named after him in Delhi

In New York he was what is known today as a "freelancer," as well as an "in house" translator. He translated several books for the publishing house of D. Appleton, and did a series of translations for newspapers. As a revolutionary activist in Cuba's long struggle for independence he translated into English a number of articles and pamphlets supporting that movement. In addition to fluent English, Martí also spoke French, Italian, Latin and Classical Greek fluently, the latter learned so he could read the Greek classical works in the original.

There was clearly a dichotomy in Martí's feeling about the kind of work he was translating. Like many professionals, he undertook for money translation tasks which had little intellectual or emotional appeal for him. Although Martí never presented a systematic theory of translation nor did he write extensively about his approach to translation, he did jot down occasional thoughts on the subject, showcasing his awareness of the translator's dilemma of the faithful versus the beautiful and stating that "translation should be natural, so that it appears that the book were written in the language to which it has been translated".

=== Modernism ===
Modernists, in general, use a subjective language. Martí's stylistic creed is part of the necessity to de-codify the logic rigor and the linguistic construction and to eliminate the intellectual, abstract and systematic expression. There is the deliberate intention and awareness to expand the expressive system of the language. The style changes the form of thinking. Without falling into unilateralism, Martí values the expression because language is an impression and a feeling through the form. Modernism mostly searches for visions and realities, the expression takes in the impressions, the state of mind, without reflection and without concept. This is the law of subjectivity. We can see this in works of Martí, one of the first modernists, who conceives the literary task like an invisible unity, an expressive totality, considering the style like "a form of the content" (forma del contenido).

The difference that Martí established between prose and poetry are conceptual. Poetry, as he believes, is a language of the permanent subjective: the intuition and the vision. The prose is an instrument and a method of spreading the ideas, and has the goal of elevating, encouraging and animating these ideas rather than having the expression of tearing up the heart, complaining and moaning. The prose is a service to his people.

Martí produces a system of specific signs "an ideological code" (código ideológico). These symbols claim their moral value and construct signs of ethic conduct. Martí's modernism was a spiritual attitude that was reflected on the language. All his writing defines his moral world. One could also say that his ideological and spiritual sphere is fortified in his writing.

The difference between Martí and other modernist initiators such as Manuel Gutiérrez Nájera, Julián del Casal, and José Asunción Silva (and the similarity between him and Manuel González Prada) lies in the profound and transcendent value that he gave to literature, converting prose into an article or the work of a journalist. This hard work was important in giving literature authentic and independent value and distancing it from mere formal amusement. Manuel Gutiérrez Nájera, Rubén Darío, Miguel de Unamuno and José Enrique Rodó saved the Martínian articles, which will have an endless value in the writings of the American continent.

Apart from Martínian articles, essay writing and literature starts to authorize itself as an alternative and privileged way to talk about politics. Literature starts to apply itself the only hermeneutics able to resolve the enigmas of a Latin American identity.

== Legacy ==
=== Symbol of Cuban independence ===
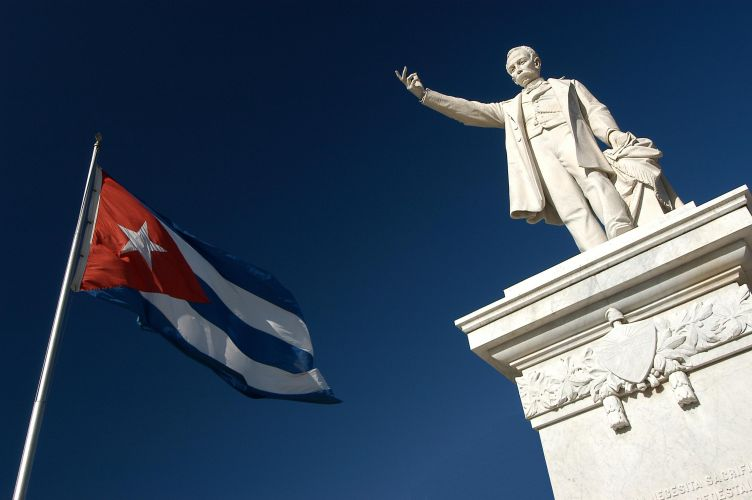
Statue of Martí in Cienfuegos, Cuba

Martí's dedication to the cause of Cuban independence and his passionate belief in democracy and justice made him a hero for many Cubans, a symbol of unity, the “Apostle". His writings have created a platform for all that he went through during the duration of this period in time. His ultimate goal of building a democratic, just, and stable republic in Cuba and his obsession with the practical execution of this goal led him to become the most charismatic leader of the 1895 colonial revolution. His work haranguing the Cuban community, raising funds, resolving the disagreements of important revolutionary leaders, and creating the Cuban Revolutionary Party to organize this effort, put into motion the Cuban war of independence. His foresight into the future, shown in his warnings against American political interests for Cuba, was confirmed by the swift occupation of Cuba by the United States following the Spanish–American War. His belief in the inseparability of Cuban and Latin American sovereignty and the expression thereof in his writings have contributed to the shape of the modern Latin American Identity. Through his beliefs for Cuban and Latin American sovereignty, Cuba revolted on former allies. This is why Cuba became an independent nation. His works are a cornerstone of Latin American and political literature and his prolific contributions to the fields of journalism, poetry, and prose are highly acclaimed.

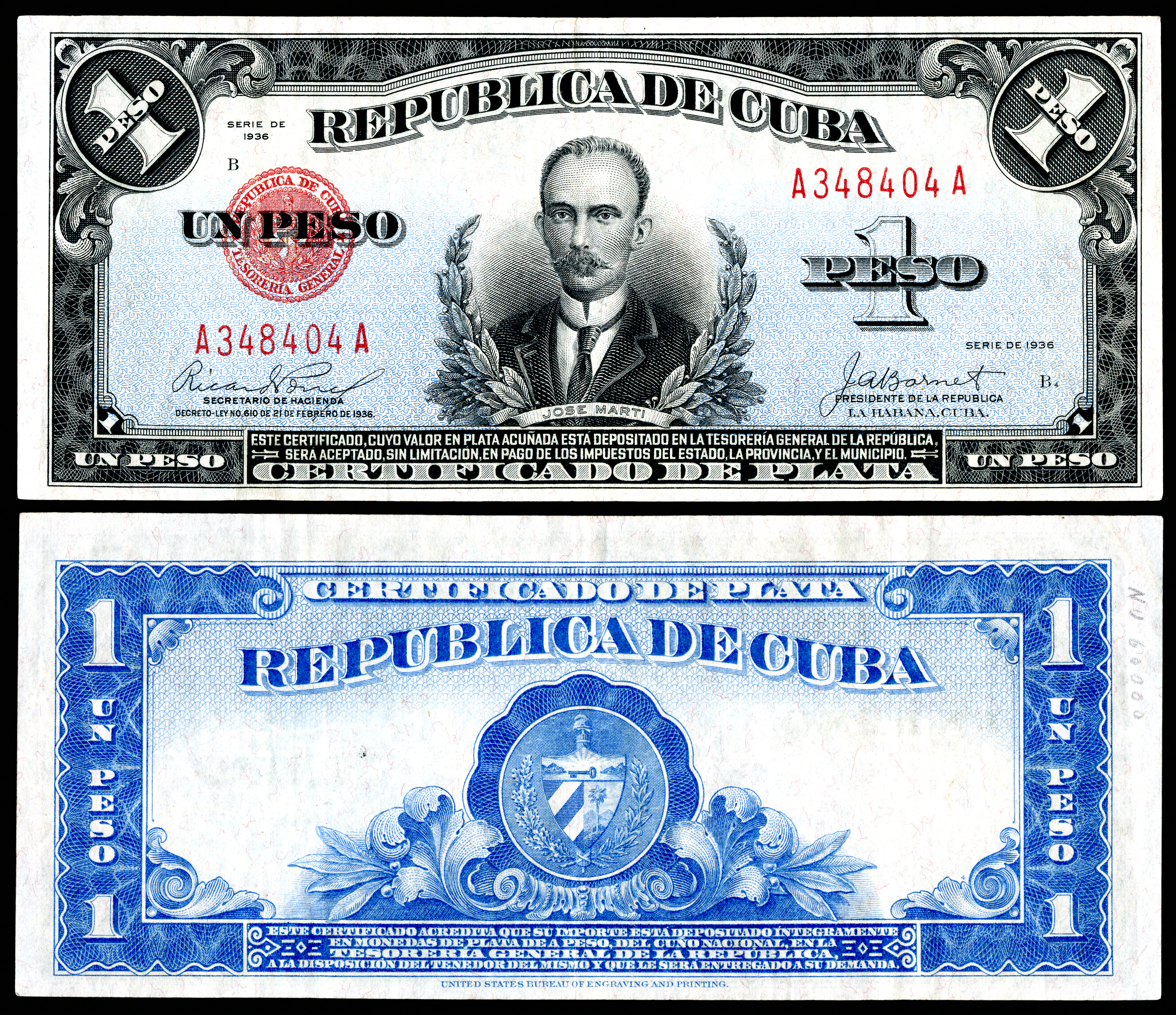
Martí depicted on a República de Cuba one peso silver certificate (1936)

=== Influence on Cuban politics ===
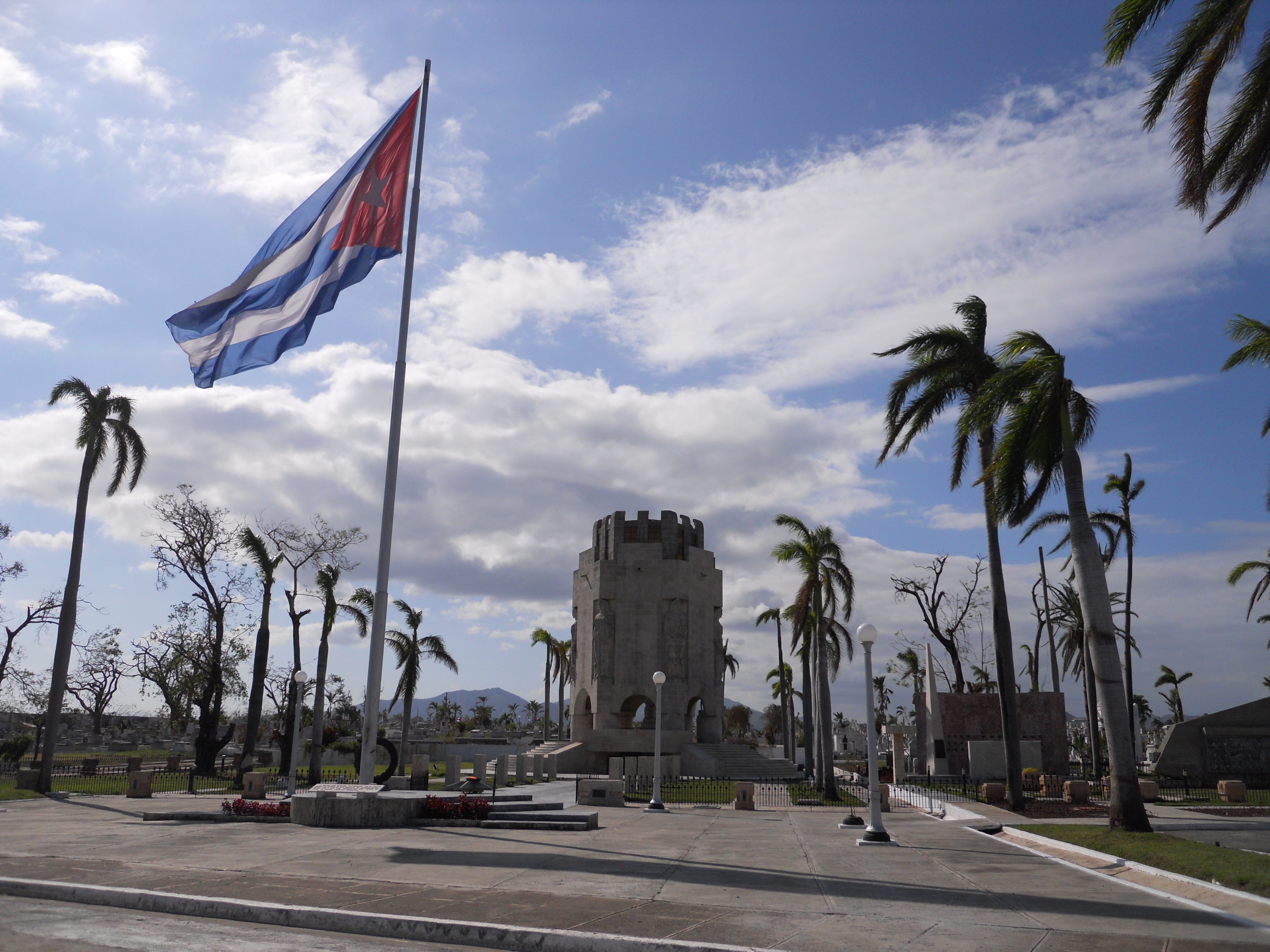
José Martí's mausoleum

Martí was a Classical liberal whose major goal was the liberation of Cuba from Spain and the establishment of a democratic republican government. His writings on the concepts of Cuban nationalism fuelled the 1895 revolution, and have continued to inform conflicting visions of the Cuban nation.
According to Carlos Ripoll, the Cuban government under the Communist Party and Castro himself associate themselves with Martí as much as possible. Examples of this include endorsing his anti-imperialist positions and downplaying his views that conflict with Cuban communist doctrine. Despite Martí never having supported communism or single party systems, Cuban leaders repeatedly cited Martí as an inspiration, and claimed that Martí's Partido Revolucionario Cubano was a "forerunner of the Communist Party". In 2016, former Cuban leader Fidel Castro was buried next to Martí in Santiago.

Regarded as Cuba's "martyr" and "apostle," several landmarks in Cuba are dedicated to Martí. During Castro's tenure, the politics and death of Martí were used to justify certain actions of the state. The Cuban government claimed that Martí had supported a single party system, creating a precedent for a communist government. On the contrary, he was an admirer of democracy and the American republican system, and throughout his life he fiercely criticized any type of dictatorial government. In addition, he also criticized Marx, and warned on several occasions about the dangers of socialism.

Martí's nuanced, often ambivalent positions on the most important issues of his day have led Marxist interpreters to see a class conflict between the proletariat and the bourgeoisie as the main theme of his works, while others have identified a liberal-capitalist emphasis. Cubans who oppose the communist government honor Martí as a defender of freedom and democracy, and a figure of hope for the Cuban nation, and condemn Castro's government for manipulating his works and creating a "Castroite Martí" to justify its "intolerance and abridgments of human rights".

=== Memorials and tributes ===
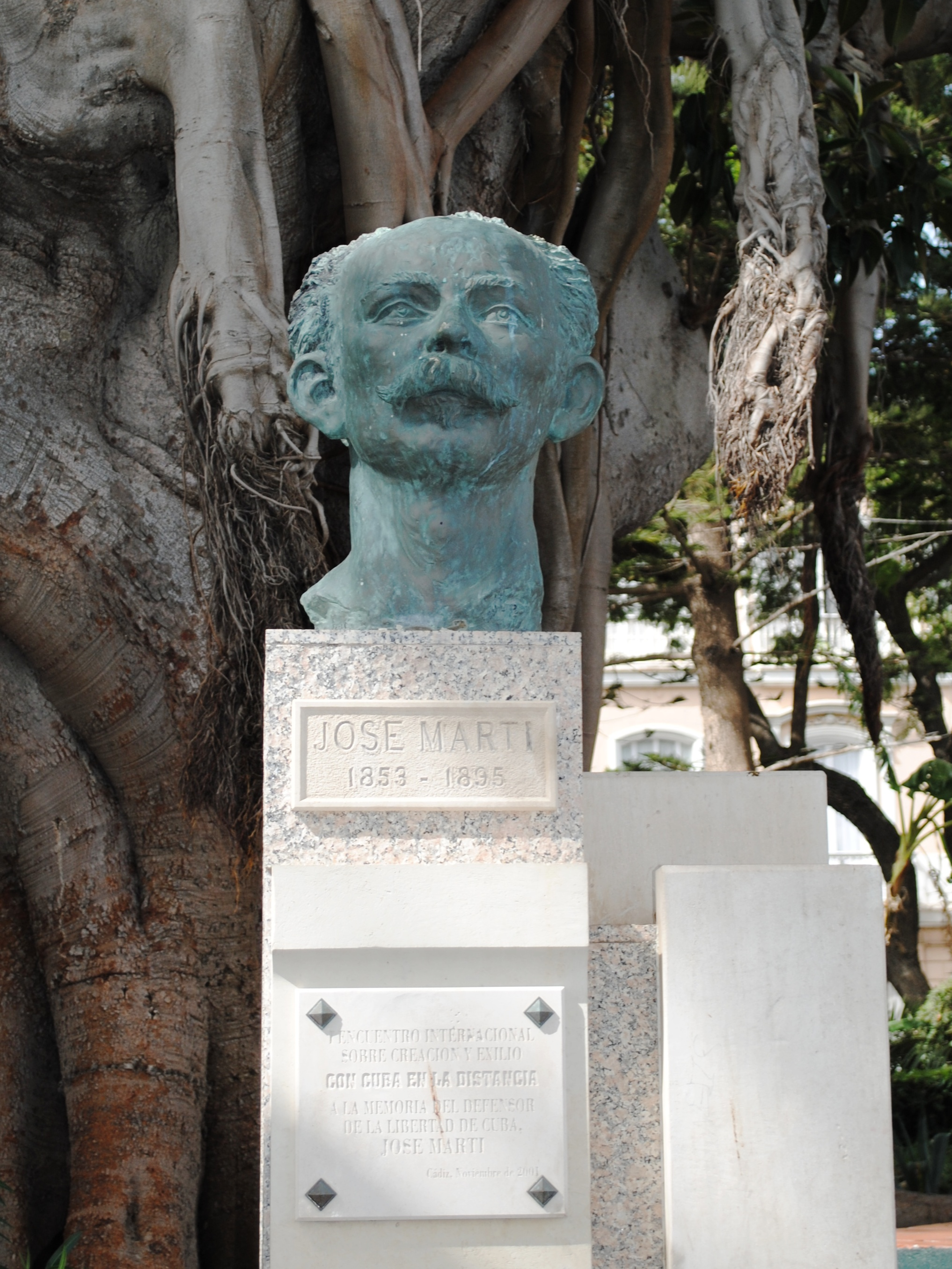
Monument of Martí in Cádiz, Spain

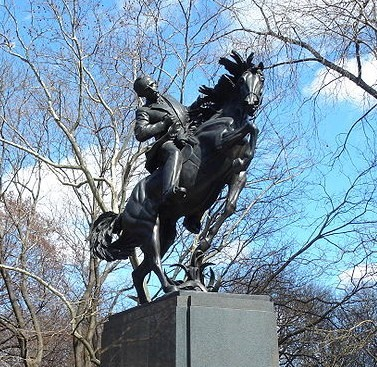
Statue of José Martí on horseback in New York's Central Park – Anna Hyatt Huntington, 1959

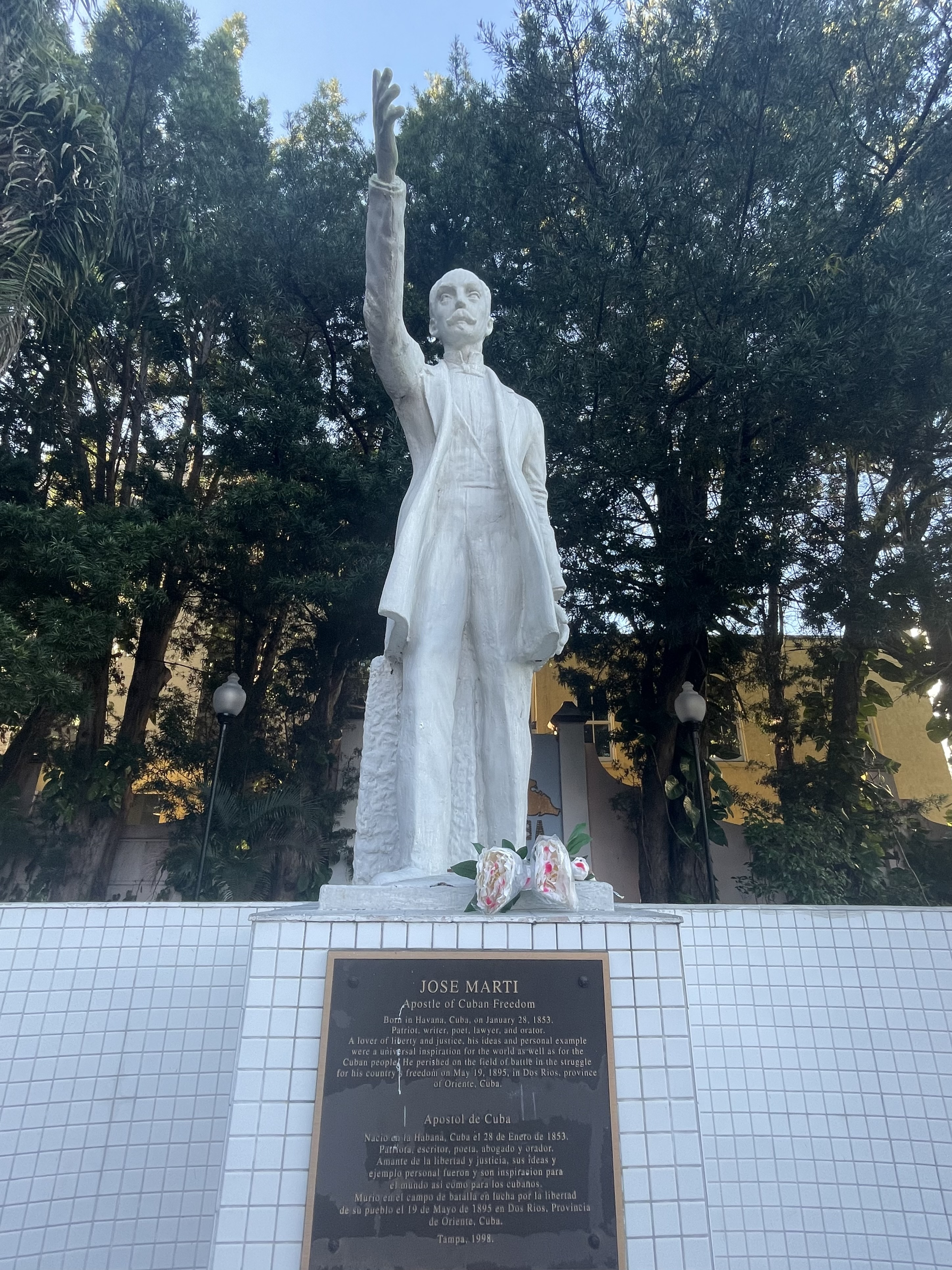
Plaque and statue of José Martí located inside the Parque Amigos de José Martí in Tampa, FL.

José Martí International Airport, Havana's international airport, is named after Martí. A statue of Martí was unveiled in Havana on his 123rd birth anniversary, with President Raúl Castro attending the ceremony. The José Martí Memorial in the Vedado neighborhood of Havana includes a 109-m tower and is the largest monument in the world dedicated to a writer.

The National Association of Hispanic Publications, a non-profit organization to promote Hispanic publications, each year designates the José Martí Awards for excellence in Hispanic media.

On the waterfront of Cap-Haïtien, Haiti, a city that José Martí visited three times, a power station is named after him. The home where he resided during his final visit in 1895 bears a marble plaque. Place José Martí (José Martí Square), featuring a bust of the poet, was inaugurated in 2014.

Parque Amigos de José Martí is a small park located in the Ybor City neighborhood of Tampa, FL. In 1956, the land was gifted to Cuba and the park was officially dedicated in 1960. The park prominently features a statue of Martí and a plaque erected in 1998. Near the park's entrance is a plaque commemorating the site of La Casa De Pedroso, a boarding house where Martí convalesced following an attempted poisoning. About a block away is another historical marker commemorating his impromptu speech to Cuban cigar workers from the steps of the Ybor Factory Building in 1893. The parks and markers are inside the Ybor City Historic District.

The White Rose German Anti-Nazi resistance group led by Sophie and Hans Scholl of the Ludwig-Maximilians-Universität München was apparently inspired by Jose Marti's verse "Cultivo Una Rosa Blanca" (Versos Sencillos).

In Bucharest Romania a public school and the Romanian-Cuban Friendship Association from Targoviste are both named "Jose Martí".

In Shively, Kentucky, a bronze bust atop a marble monument pays tribute to José Martí.

In 2009, a bronze statue was built on Boulevard Louis Blanc, in Montpellier, the first such statue of Martí in France.

== List of selected works ==
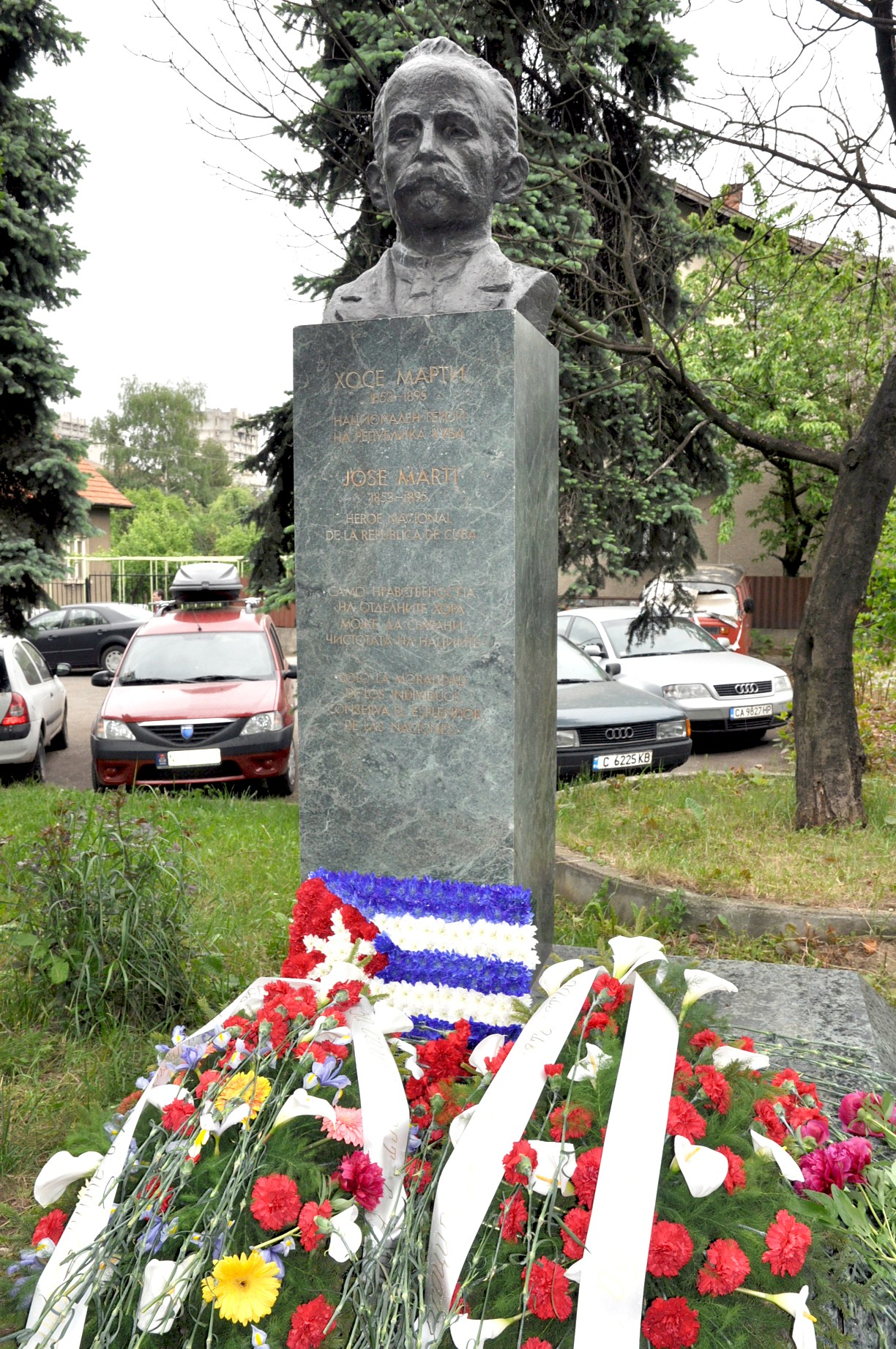
Monument to José Martí in Sofia, Bulgaria

Martí's fundamental works published during his life

- 1869 January: Abdala
- 1869 January: 10 de octubre
- 1871: El presidio político en Cuba
- 1873: La República Española ante la revolución cubana
- 1875: Amor con amor se paga
- 1882: Ismaelillo
- 1882 February: Ryan vs. Sullivan
- 1882 February: Un incendio
- 1882 July: El ajusticiamiento de Guiteau
- 1883 January: Batallas de la Paz
- 1883 March: Que son graneros humanos
- 1883 March: Karl Marx ha muerto
- 1883 March:El Puente de Brooklyn
- 1883 September: En Coney Island se vacía Nueva York
- 1883 December: Los políticos de oficio"
- 1883 December: Bufalo Bil
- 1884 April: Los caminadores
- 1884 November: Norteamericanos
- 1884 November: El juego de pelota de pies
- 1885: Amistad funesta
- 1885 January: Teatro en Nueva York
- 1885 Una gran rosa de bronce encendida
- 1885 March:Los fundadores de la constitución
- 1885 June: Somos pueblo original
- 1885 August: Los políticos tiene sus púgiles
- 1886 May: Las revueltas anarquistas de Chicago
- 1886 September: La ensenanza
- 1886 October: La Estatua de la Libertad
- 1887 April: El poeta Walt Whitman
- 1887 April: El Madison Square
- 1887 November: Ejecución de los dirigentes anarquistas de Chicago
- 1887 November: La gran Nevada
- 1888 May: El ferrocarril elevado
- 1888 August: Verano en Nueva York
- 1888 November: Ojos abiertos, y gargantas secas
- 1888 November: Amanece y ya es fragor
- 1889: La edad de oro
- 1889 May: El centenario de George Washington
- 1889 July: Bañistas
- 1889 August: Nube Roja
- 1889 September: La caza de negros
- 1890 November: El jardín de las orquídeas
- 1891 October: Versos sencillos
- 1891 January: Nuestra América
- 1894 January: ¡A Cuba!
- 1895: Manifiesto de Montecristi- coauthor with Máximo Gómez

Martí's major posthumous works

- Adúltera
- Versos libres

== See also ==
- International José Martí Prize
- Radio y Televisión Martí
- Bust of José Martí, Houston, Texas
- Monument to José Martí, Madrid, Spain
- Guantanamera
