= Two Rivers High School =

Two Rivers High School may refer to:

- Two Rivers High School (Arkansas), unincorporated Yell County, Arkansas, near Plainview and Ola
- Two Rivers High School (Minnesota), Mendota Heights, Minnesota
- Two Rivers High School (Wisconsin), Two Rivers, Wisconsin
- Two Rivers Magnet Middle School, East Hartford, Connecticut

== See also ==
- Two Rivers (disambiguation)
