= Simple Verses =

Simple Verses (Spanish: Versos sencillos) is a poetry collection by Cuban writer and independence hero José Martí. Published in October 1891, it was the last of Martí's works to be printed before his death in 1895. Originally written in Spanish, it has been translated into over ten languages. Among the poems in the collection are Yo soy un hombre sincero (I), Si ves un monte de espumas (V) and Cultivo una rosa blanca (XXXIX). Verses pruned from various poems were adapted into the folk song "Guantanamera", which is the most popular patriotic song of Cuba and was popularized in the US in the 1960s during the American folk music revival.

== Overview ==
The bulk of the book was written in 1890 while Martí was convalescing in a small town called Haines Falls in the Catskill Mountains. The manuscript was first read in public in December of that year at the home of Carmen Miyares in New York City; it was published ten months later by Louis Weiss & Co. of New York.

The book comprises 46 poems, written in four-line stanzas (quatrains) of octosyllabic verse. The diction is clean, sparse, and the verses display regular rhyme schemes and alliteration. The work is rich in the symbolism of color; its verses known for their spontaneity and transparency. Their style has been compared to that of Zen watercolor paintings.

== Legacy ==
Cultivo una rosa blanca (XXXIX) is often one of the first poems learned by school children in Latin America. In 2007, to celebrate the 154th anniversary of the author's birth, students laid white roses at the foot of the José Martí Memorial in Havana's Plaza de la Revolución.

== See also ==
- Modernismo
- Cuban literature
