= Battle of Dos Ríos =

1895 Cuban War of Independence battle

Battle of Dos Rios
- Part of Cuban War of Independence
- Death of José Martí during the battle
Date	19 May 1895
Location	Dos Rios, Cuba
Result	Spanish victory

Belligerents
Cuba	Spain

Commanders and leaders
Máximo Gómez; José Martí †	Col. Sandoval, Col. Salvador Arizón (WIA)

Strength
700	Unknown

Casualties and losses
1-14 killed, at least 1 wounded	5-7 killed, 7 wounded

The Battle of Dos Ríos was fought in Cuba during its war of independence from Spain. It was a rearguard action fought by the Cuban Liberation Army against Spanish forces, which allowed the rebels to escape to the west of the island. Casualty figures vary but on the rebel side included revolutionary leader José Martí.

== Battle ==
The battle was fought at Dos Ríos (near Palma Soriano) near to the confluence of the Contramaestre and Cauto rivers. It was a rearguard action by the Cuban Liberation Army against the pursuing Spanish forces near to the start of the Cuban War of Independence. The Liberation Army escaped and, under the command of Antonio Maceo, went on to enjoy success against the Spaniards in the west of the island, until the Spanish garrison was reinforced. Rebel leader Máximo Gómez recorded in his diary that his men inflicted seven casualties on the Spanish while suffering only one loss in return, that of revolutionary José Martí. This count has been regarded as correct by independent observers at the time and by later historians. The Spanish commander Colonel Ximinez de Sandoval claimed that, besides Marti, his men killed 14 rebels and wounded many more, while he lost 5 men killed and 7 wounded. Casualty counts from all known witnesses range from 1-14 killed on the rebel side and 5-7 on the Spanish. Gomez was also wounded in the action.

== Death of Marti ==
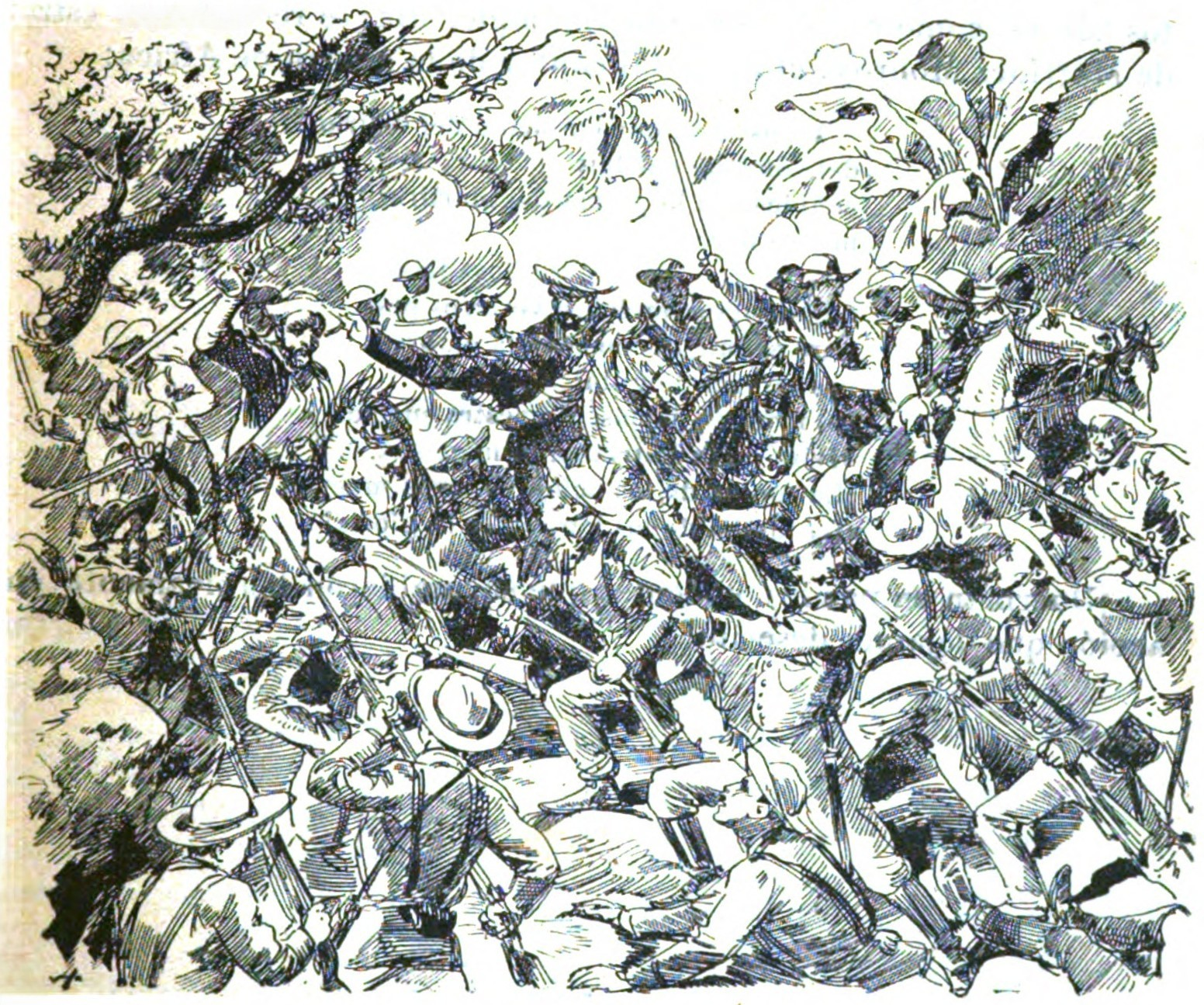
Death of José Martí during the battle (illustration by Luís Labarta, 1895

Marti's death came when he was charging fruitlessly against the Spanish forces. Marti had disregarded orders from Gómez to avoid the front line, and was struck by three bullets. According to comrades he rode a white horse at the front of his troops and his body was subsequently mutilated by the Spanish soldiers. An attempt to recover Martí's body was made by the rebels but the Spanish forces were too strong. Spanish forces buried José Martí; the body was subsequently exhumed and reburied with an elaborate funeral in Santiago de Cuba in 1951. The Spanish Captain-General of Cuba Arsenio Martínez Campos declared that the killing of Marti had struck the "death blow to the bandits".

Following the 1950s Cuban Revolution the death of Marti entered the revolutionary calendar and was commemorated by agricultural production goals and by ceremonies.
