= Les Deux Rives =

École des Deux-Rives

Location
- 7674 Stave Lake Road; Mission, British Columbia, V2V 4G4; Canada
- Coordinates: 49°8′29″N 122°17′31″W

Information
- School type: Public, Elementary school and high school
- Established: 1998
- School board: Conseil scolaire francophone de la Colombie-Britannique
- School number: 9375920
- Principal: Fariba Daragahi
- Staff: 13
- Grades: K-7
- Enrollment: 95 (September 2008)
- Language: French
- Website: deuxrives.csf.bc.ca
- Last updated: December 21, 2007

École élémentaire des Deux-Rives is a French first language school located in Mission, British Columbia, Canada.
