= Two Rivers Ranch =

Two Rivers Ranch is a privately held cow/calf ranch business on 14,000 acres in Florida. The property crosses into Hillsborough County, Pasco County and Hernando County and is named for the two rivers converging on the property, the Hillsborough River and Blackwater Creek. The land includes pasture, planted pines and wetland habitats.

== History ==
It was acquired in 1932 by Wayne Thomas as relatively barren land following clearcuts that occurred around the start of the 20th century. It is now owned by Robert Thomas and is a supplier of spring water. A plan to sell off and develop 3,500 acres with residential and commercial construction was proposed in 2005. In 2007 the plan was dropped over road construction while zoning changes continued to be pursued.

== Land use ==
The area provides habitat for fox squirrel, gopher tortoise, turkey, deer, and quail. It is the largest privately owned undeveloped property in Hillsborough County and is about 20 miles (30 minutes) away is the city of Tampa with approximately 3 million people living within a 50-mile radius. The ranch is home to Crystal Springs (Hillsborough County), producing about 40 million gallons a day for the Zephyrhills Natural Spring Water Company. The property is part of land holdings that included Hillsborough State Park, donated in 1936, and another 115 acres donated for the restoration of Fort Foster. Canoe access to the Hillsborough River is available on the property. Habitats on the property include upland ridges, oak hammocks, sloughs, herbaceous wetlands, pasture, native range, plantation pines, cypress domes, flatwoods, and flood plain forest.
