= American Healthcare Professionals and Friends for Medicine in Israel =

- Established: 1950; 76 years ago
- Founder: Morton J. Robbins
- Headquarters: Boston, Massachusetts
- Website: apfmed.org
- Formerly called: American Physicians Fellowship for the Israel Medical Association

American Healthcare Professionals and Friends for Medicine in Israel (APF), formerly known as the American Physicians Fellowship for the Israel Medical Association, is an American non-profit organization founded in 1950 which supports projects that advance medical education, research, and healthcare in Israel and builds links between the medical communities of Israel and North America. APF provides fellowships for Israeli physicians training in North America and coordinates American and Canadian medical emergency volunteers with the government of Israel.

== Overview ==
APF was founded in 1950 by a group of American Jewish physicians in New England led by Morton Robbins of Manchester, New Hampshire in order to support their professional colleagues in the newly founded State of Israel. In announcing the creation of the organization, Robbins said, "Through this Fellowship Committee, members of the medical profession of this country will have the opportunity to provide assistance and cooperation to the physicians in Israel, to provide post-graduate scholarships for physicians from Israel and to help teach them American medical techniques and know-hows in this country."

In 1952, APF sponsored its first fellow in the U.S., Haim Cohen, a refugee from Greece and a survivor of the 1948 Hadassah medical convoy massacre. To date, APF has granted fellowships for specialty medical training to more than 1,500 Israeli physicians, many of whom today fill senior positions in Israel's hospitals and medical schools.

During the 1967 Six-Day War and the 1973 Yom Kippur War, APF brought its members to Israel to volunteer in hospitals to assume the duties of Israeli doctors that had been called up to military service. As a result, the government of Israel formally appointed APF as the exclusive organization for maintaining the register of American and Canadian doctors willing to come work in Israel during times of emergency. During the Gulf War, IDF Surgeon General Yehuda Danon said that for this service Israel considers the APF "a vital link in the system of providing medical services here under all circumstances, and we very much appreciate your efforts on this behalf."
