= Two Rivers Detention Facility =

Prison in Hardin, Montana, U.S.

Coordinates: 45°44′25″N 107°36′02″W

Rocky Mountain Regional Detention Facility
- Interactive map of Rocky Mountain Regional Detention Facility
- Location: 1015 N. Lessard Avenue, Hardin, Montana
- Status: Operational
- Security class: Minimum
- Capacity: 464
- Opened: April 2019
- Managed by: Bureau of Indian Affairs

The Rocky Mountain Regional Detention Facility, formerly known as the Two Rivers Regional Detention Facility, is a privately owned, government-operated detention facility located in Hardin, Montana, which was first proposed as economic development in 2004, and was completed in the summer of 2007. It first held prisoners in 2014, substantially under capacity, until it was closed in 2016. Two Rivers Authority concluded a lease arrangement with the Bureau of Indian Affairs (BIA) in December 2018, and the BIA took possession and began operations in April 2019.

== Construction ==
The 464-bed minimum security detention facility was completed in September 2007, built with $27.4 million in high interest revenue bonds issued by the city's new industrial development corporation, the Two Rivers Port Authority (TRA) and sold by bond brokers Municipal Capital Markets and Herbert J. Sims. It fostered the hopes of creating 100-plus jobs and stimulating the economy of the small town of 3,400.

The facility was promoted by a consortium of mostly Texan bond brokers, builders (Hale-Mills construction), architects (James Parkey/Corplan) and operators (Civigenics/Community Education Centers), despite an initial economic feasibility analysis that concluded it would not be a viable project, and despite substantial legislative obstacles.

== Struggle to find clients ==
Once complete, because of various legal and political issues, Two Rivers Authority and the original operator were unable to obtain any contracts to house inmates. Although five interest payments had been made from the bond issue's reserve fund, the bonds were declared in technical default in May 2008.

In the fall of 2008, unsuccessful at attracting contracts from various counties, states, tribes and federal agencies, it was proposed to the State of Montana to house a sexual offender program. Hardin's incomplete bid was twice rejected.

In January 2009, the two-year contract was not renewed and the operator, Civigenics/Community Education Centers, withdrew its last two employees that it had imported from Texas.

In March 2009, the Hardin City Council voted 5-0 to back a proposal to bring detainees from the United States detention camps at Guantanamo Bay, Cuba, to Hardin, although state congressional leaders had opposed the plan.

On September 3–4, 2009, the economic development director, the attorney and the vice president of Hardin's TRA negotiated a draft contract with a Southern Californian confidence man, "Michael Hilton." Hilton was an ex-convict Serbian immigrant with more than a dozen aliases and criminal convictions, who lost many fraud, rescission and unlawful detainer cases with over $1 million in adverse judgments against him.

Despite the furor, elected and appointed officials from Hardin continued to vouch for the viability of the contract and for Hilton's alleged reformation.

The bondholding investors and trustee, whose agreement was necessary for the contract to be accepted, hesitated to comply.

By January 2010, the TRA had hired its fifth director who was laboring to find inmates for the empty jail. There remained about $814,000 remaining in a "reserve fund" managed by the trustee of the bonds sold to build the facility. That money was earmarked to pay insurance, heat, electricity and the bare minimum of services the building requires to be operational.

"Kim Hammond, mayor of Hardin, has warned cities...to tread lightly when considering the proposals brought forth by private companies like Corplan."

In October 2011, Two Rivers Authority responded to a Request for Information by the Montana Department of Corrections. In late January 2012, the Montana Department of Corrections issued a Request for Proposals (RFP) seeking 120 beds for special-needs inmates. The RFP was cancelled and DOC Director Mike Ferriter indicated that it might not be reissued at all.

== Under Emerald ==
In April 2014, Emerald Correctional Management, LLC, of Louisiana renewed efforts to obtain contracts to get it operational, holding a job fair to recruit potential employees. In May 2014, Two Rivers Authority and Emerald Correctional Management, LLC, completed contracts relating to the startup and operational management of the Facility.

After being vacant for over seven years after construction was completed, the Facility became operational in July 2014 and in August 2014 accepted the first inmate. By early October, with Emerald Corrections operating the facility, the inmate population had increased to almost 60. By February 2016, although at one point the inmate population had swelled to 250 with Native Americans and North Dakota county jail prisoners, it was once again empty. By then, its bond indebtedness, thanks to non-payment on debt and interest accrued, had increased to over $40 million. Emerald ceased all business in 2017.

== Most recent efforts to utilize facility ==
Montana U.S. Senator Steve Daines pressed the Bureau of Indian Affairs to contract with the facility, hoping to hold prisoners by January 2018. Two Rivers Authority concluded a lease arrangement with the Bureau of Indian Affairs in December 2018; the BIA took possession and began operations in April 2019.
