= Hardin, Montana =

City in Montana, United States

Hardin, Montana Chichúche (Crow) He'konemâhoeve'ho'eno (Cheyenne)
- City
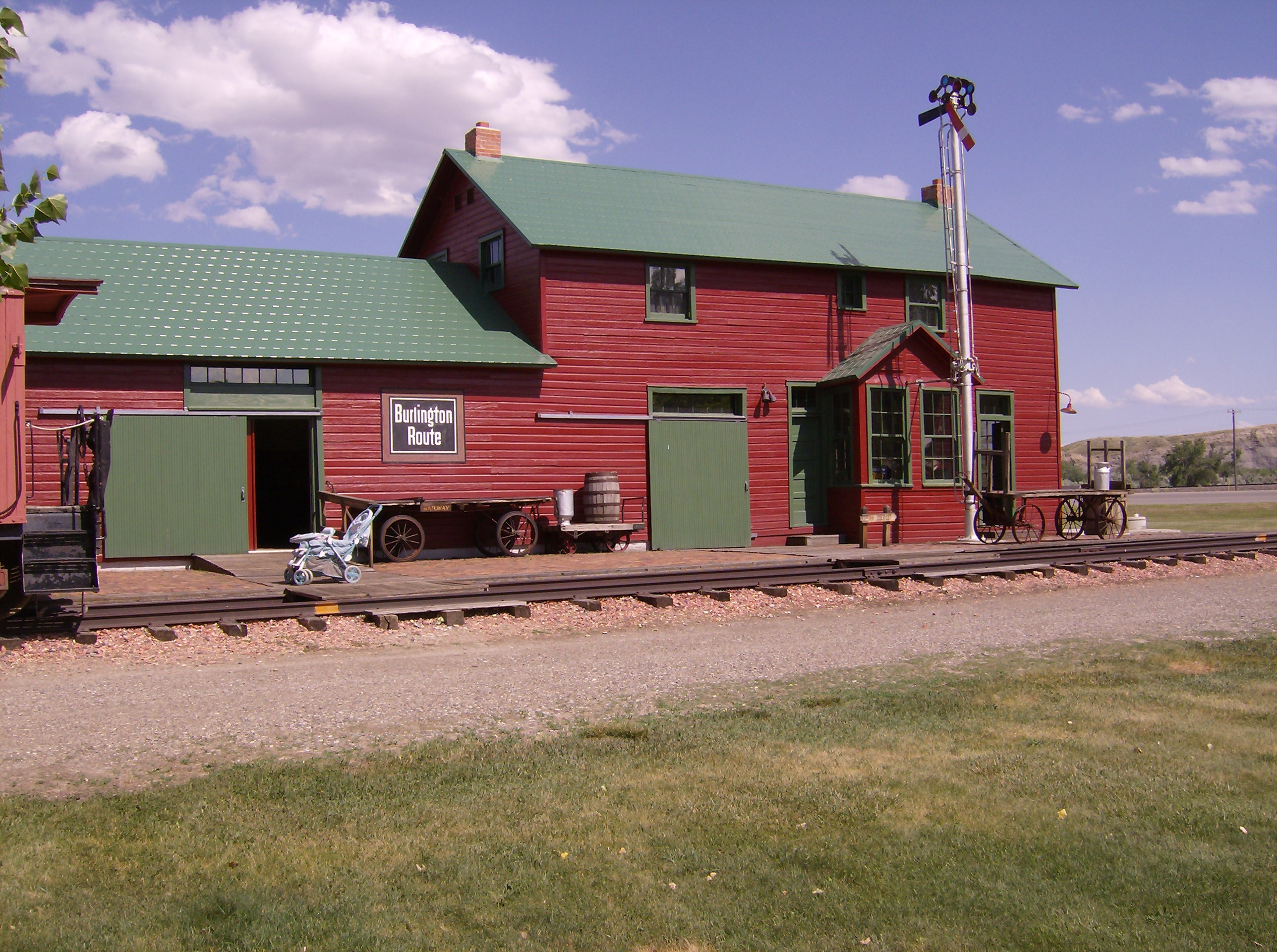
- Former train depot, originally from Lodge Grass, now featured among other buildings at the Big Horn County Historical Museum in Hardin.

- Logo
- Motto: A city with a reason. . .
- Location of Hardin, Montana
- Coordinates: 45°43′55″N 107°36′45″W
- Country: United States
- State: Montana
- County: Big Horn

Area
  - Total: 2.97 sq mi (7.70 km^{2})
  - Land: 2.97 sq mi (7.70 km^{2})
  - Water: 0 sq mi (0.00 km^{2})
- Elevation: 2,900 ft (880 m)

Population (2020)
  - Total: 3,818
  - Density: 1,284.1/sq mi (495.78/km^{2})
- Time zone: UTC-7 (Mountain (MST))
  - Summer (DST): UTC-6 (MDT)
- ZIP code: 59034
- Area code: 406
- FIPS code: 30-34225
- GNIS feature ID: 2410700
- Website: www.hardinmontana.gov

Hardin (Crow: Chichúche) is a city in and the county seat of Big Horn County, Montana, United States. The population was 3,818 at the 2020 census.

It is located just north of the Crow Indian Reservation.

== History ==
The city was named for Samuel Hardin (1846-1921), a friend of developer Charles Henry Morrill. It was incorporated in 1911. Thomas D. Campbell operated the nation's largest wheat farm on 95,000 acres near here and pioneered the use of industrial machinery in farming. The Holly Sugar Corporation established a sugar beet–processing plant in Hardin in 1937.

== Geography ==
According to the United States Census Bureau, the city has a total area of 2.57 square miles (6.66 km^{2}), all land.

The Little Bighorn River empties into the Bighorn River east of town.

=== Climate ===
According to the Köppen Climate Classification system, Hardin has a cold semi-arid climate, abbreviated "BSk" on climate maps.

Climate data for Hardin, Montana, 1991–2020 normals, extremes 1948–present
Month	Jan	Feb	Mar	Apr	May	Jun	Jul	Aug	Sep	Oct	Nov	Dec	Year
Record high °F (°C)	70 (21)	74 (23)	84 (29)	96 (36)	97 (36)	106 (41)	112 (44)	109 (43)	104 (40)	94 (34)	81 (27)	72 (22)	112 (44)
Mean maximum °F (°C)	56.7 (13.7)	60.8 (16.0)	72.6 (22.6)	82.3 (27.9)	88.2 (31.2)	97.0 (36.1)	101.7 (38.7)	100.7 (38.2)	95.9 (35.5)	83.6 (28.7)	69.1 (20.6)	58.9 (14.9)	103.0 (39.4)
Mean daily maximum °F (°C)	36.4 (2.4)	41.1 (5.1)	52.8 (11.6)	62.1 (16.7)	71.4 (21.9)	81.0 (27.2)	90.7 (32.6)	89.7 (32.1)	79.1 (26.2)	63.6 (17.6)	48.3 (9.1)	38.0 (3.3)	62.9 (17.2)
Daily mean °F (°C)	23.7 (−4.6)	27.8 (−2.3)	37.9 (3.3)	47.0 (8.3)	56.3 (13.5)	65.3 (18.5)	73.1 (22.8)	71.5 (21.9)	61.6 (16.4)	48.2 (9.0)	34.9 (1.6)	25.5 (−3.6)	47.7 (8.7)
Mean daily minimum °F (°C)	10.9 (−11.7)	14.5 (−9.7)	23.1 (−4.9)	31.8 (−0.1)	41.2 (5.1)	49.7 (9.8)	55.5 (13.1)	53.3 (11.8)	44.1 (6.7)	32.8 (0.4)	21.5 (−5.8)	12.9 (−10.6)	32.6 (0.3)
Mean minimum °F (°C)	−15.7 (−26.5)	−8.7 (−22.6)	1.6 (−16.9)	18.5 (−7.5)	28.9 (−1.7)	39.8 (4.3)	47.5 (8.6)	44.2 (6.8)	32.5 (0.3)	16.0 (−8.9)	−0.4 (−18.0)	−10.2 (−23.4)	−23.4 (−30.8)
Record low °F (°C)	−43 (−42)	−38 (−39)	−31 (−35)	−1 (−18)	15 (−9)	30 (−1)	34 (1)	30 (−1)	15 (−9)	−14 (−26)	−31 (−35)	−47 (−44)	−47 (−44)
Average precipitation inches (mm)	0.50 (13)	0.55 (14)	0.89 (23)	1.50 (38)	2.52 (64)	1.92 (49)	1.28 (33)	0.86 (22)	1.36 (35)	1.36 (35)	0.52 (13)	0.49 (12)	13.75 (351)
Average snowfall inches (cm)	6.0 (15)	6.2 (16)	3.4 (8.6)	1.3 (3.3)	0.0 (0.0)	0.0 (0.0)	0.0 (0.0)	0.0 (0.0)	0.0 (0.0)	1.6 (4.1)	3.1 (7.9)	6.3 (16)	27.9 (70.9)
Average precipitation days (≥ 0.01 in)	5.2	5.0	5.5	7.0	8.7	8.1	5.4	4.1	5.4	6.6	5.0	4.1	70.1
Average snowy days (≥ 0.1 in)	3.3	3.3	1.8	0.6	0.0	0.0	0.0	0.0	0.0	0.6	1.4	2.4	13.4
Source 1: NOAA
Source 2: National Weather Service

== Demographics ==
Historical population
Census	Pop.	Note	%±
1920	1,312		—
1930	1,169		−10.9%
1940	1,886		61.3%
1950	2,306		22.3%
1960	2,789		20.9%
1970	2,733		−2.0%
1980	3,300		20.7%
1990	2,940		−10.9%
2000	3,384		15.1%
2010	3,505		3.6%
2020	3,818		8.9%
U.S. Decennial Census

=== 2020 census ===
As of the 2020 census, Hardin had a population of 3,818. The median age was 33.1 years. 30.7% of residents were under the age of 18 and 15.2% of residents were 65 years of age or older. For every 100 females there were 93.0 males, and for every 100 females age 18 and over there were 88.7 males age 18 and over.

0.0% of residents lived in urban areas, while 100.0% lived in rural areas.

There were 1,291 households in Hardin, of which 35.6% had children under the age of 18 living in them. Of all households, 40.7% were married-couple households, 18.5% were households with a male householder and no spouse or partner present, and 34.3% were households with a female householder and no spouse or partner present. About 31.7% of all households were made up of individuals and 14.0% had someone living alone who was 65 years of age or older.

There were 1,473 housing units, of which 12.4% were vacant. The homeowner vacancy rate was 1.8% and the rental vacancy rate was 13.3%.

Racial composition as of the 2020 census
Race	Number	Percent
White	1,543	40.4%
Black or African American	1	0.0%
American Indian and Alaska Native	1,894	49.6%
Asian	31	0.8%
Native Hawaiian and Other Pacific Islander	2	0.1%
Some other race	62	1.6%
Two or more races	285	7.5%
Hispanic or Latino (of any race)	292	7.6%

=== 2010 census ===
As of the census of 2010, there were 3,505 people, 1,301 households, and 850 families living in the city. The population density was 1,363.8 inhabitants per square mile (526.6/km^{2}). There were 1,401 housing units at an average density of 545.1 per square mile (210.5/km^{2}). The racial makeup of the city was 49.8% White, 0.7% African American, 40.8% Native American, 1.2% Asian, 0.1% Pacific Islander, 2.2% from other races, and 5.1% from two or more races. Hispanic or Latino of any race were 7.1% of the population.

There were 1,301 households, of which 37.2% had children under the age of 18 living with them, 43.4% were married couples living together, 15.4% had a female householder with no husband present, 6.5% had a male householder with no wife present, and 34.7% were non-families. 30.7% of all households were made up of individuals, and 14.4% had someone living alone who was 65 years of age or older. The average household size was 2.64 and the average family size was 3.29.

The median age in the city was 33.2 years. 29.7% of residents were under the age of 18; 10.1% were between the ages of 18 and 24; 22.1% were from 25 to 44; 24.7% were from 45 to 64; and 13.3% were 65 years of age or older. The gender makeup of the city was 48.7% male and 51.3% female.

=== 2000 census ===
As of the census of 2000, there were 3,384 people, 1,295 households, and 868 families living in the city. The population density was 2,415.5 inhabitants per square mile (932.6/km^{2}). There were 1,411 housing units at an average density of 1,007.2 per square mile (388.9/km^{2}). The racial makeup of the city was 62.26% White, 0.12% African American, 31.59% Native American, 0.35% Asian, 1.03% from other races, and 4.64% from two or more races. Hispanic or Latino of any race were 5.53% of the population.

There were 1,295 households, out of which 36.2% had children under the age of 18 living with them, 46.3% were married couples living together, 16.6% had a female householder with no husband present, and 32.9% were non-families. 29.2% of all households were made up of individuals, and 12.7% had someone living alone who was 65 years of age or older. The average household size was 2.55 and the average family size was 3.16.

In the city, the population was spread out, with 31.0% under the age of 18, 7.7% from 18 to 24, 26.3% from 25 to 44, 21.1% from 45 to 64, and 13.9% who were 65 years of age or older. The median age was 34 years. For every 100 females there were 88.8 males. For every 100 females age 18 and over, there were 79.6 males.

The median income for a household in the city was $28,018, and the median income for a family was $33,729. Males had a median income of $28,493 versus $19,444 for females. The per capita income for the city was $13,041. About 17.2% of families and 23.9% of the population were below the poverty line, including 33.1% of those under age 18 and 13.1% of those age 65 or over.

== Economy ==
The city developed an 800 acre industrial park. It has access to Interstate and rail.

Hardin hosts a bitcoin mining facility by Marathon Patent Group, according to a press release by the company in 2021.

== Jail ==
In 2004–05, a consortium including architectural, bond sellers and contractors located in Texas, promoting the construction of speculative prison and jail ventures convinced Hardin's industrial development authority to float a $27 million bond issuance to build the Two Rivers Detention Facility. It was designed for 464 inmates, and was to be located on a 40-acre (160,000 m^{2}) sugar beet field. The facility was slated to open in July 2007 but the state of Montana would not approve it. The Authority bonds defaulted on May 1, 2008. The consortium's contract terminated in January 2009 without any prisoners ever being housed in the jail.

In November 2009 the Two Rivers Board hired its fifth director. A reserve fund of $814,000 was earmarked to maintain the building for possible future use. It remained complete and vacant for over seven years, though it was partially filled for 18 months. By February 2016, empty once again, it had cost the city $582,595 paid to Two Rivers to maintain it since 2004. Due to unpaid interest on the defaulted bonds, its estimated indebtedness had increased to over $40 million by December 2015.

In April 2019, the Bureau of Indian Affairs took possession and began operations. The name was changed to the Rocky Mountain Regional Detention Facility.

== Arts and culture ==
The Big Horn County Historical Museum is located in Hardin. It sits on 35 acres and has 24 historic structures.

The Hardin Area Chamber of Commerce and Agriculture conducts the annual Little Big Horn Days festival the 3rd weekend in June. It includes the Custer's Last Stand Reenactment written by Joe Medicine Crow. There is also a PRCA rodeo and Crow Native Days.

The Big Horn County Library operates in Hardin.

== Government ==
Hardin has a mayor and six city councilors. There are three wards, each with two councilors. In the November 2025 elections, Riley Ramsey defeated incumbent mayor Joseph Purcell. Purcell replaced Jack Lane in 2019.

A proposal to adopt a self-governing charter government was voted on in November 2026. The proposal failed with 65% voting to retain the existing form of government.

== Education ==
The Hardin School District educates students from kindergarten to 12th grade. The Hardin Elementary School District has 5 schools. Hardin High School had 529 students enrolled in the 2021-2022 school year. Their team name is the Bulldogs.

== Media ==
=== Radio ===
- KHDN 1230 AM has a news talk information format.
- KNPC 88.5 FM has a religious format.
- KRWS-LP 100.7 FM has an oldies format.

=== Newspapers ===
- Big Horn County News
- The Original Briefs

=== Television ===
Hardin is the city of license for Fox network affiliate KHMT, channel 4, whose studio facilities are located on South 24th Street West in Billings; its transmitter is located in unincorporated southeastern Yellowstone County (southeast of Indian Arrow).

Hardin is primarily served by the Billings media market.

== Infrastructure ==
Interstate 90 passes the northern part of town from east to west. It is also served by Old US Route 87 as a frontage road as well as secondary highways 216, 236, 307, 313, and 384.

Big Horn County Airport is a public use airport located 3 miles west of town. The nearest commercial airport is Billings Logan International Airport.

== Notable people ==
- Kroy Biermann, NFL defensive end
- Bill Christiansen, 25th Lieutenant Governor of Montana
- Kendall Cross, Olympic Gold Medalist in Freestyle Wrestling
- Tim Fox, Attorney General of Montana
- Carroll Graham, Montana State Senator
