= Elizabeth Bacon Custer =

Wife and widow of George Armstrong Custer (1842–1933)

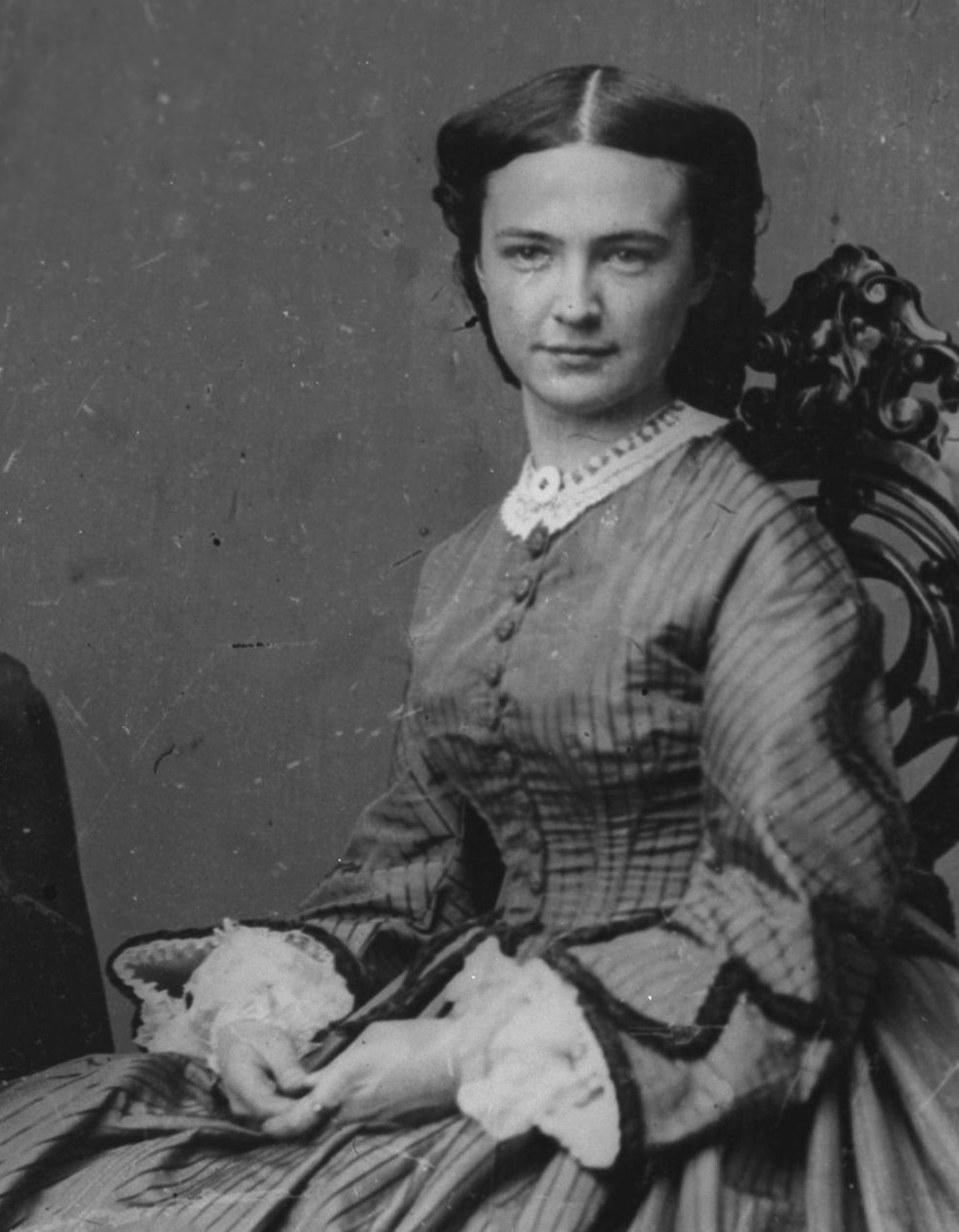
- Custer, 1864
- Born: Elizabeth Clift Bacon; April 8, 1842; Monroe, Michigan, U.S.
- Died: April 4, 1933 (aged 90); New York City, New York, U.S.
- Occupations: Author; lecturer
- Spouse: George Armstrong Custer (m. 1864; died 1876)
- Writing career
- Pen name: Libbie Bacon
- Period: 1885–93
- Genre: Non-fiction
- Notable works: Boots and Saddles; Tenting on the Plains; Following the Guidon

Elizabeth Clift Custer (née Bacon; April 8, 1842 – April 4, 1933) was the wife of George Armstrong Custer, the United States Army officer. She spent most of their passionate twelve-year marriage in relative proximity to him despite his numerous military campaigns in the American Civil War and subsequent postings on the Great Plains as a commanding officer in the United States Cavalry.

Left nearly destitute in the aftermath of her husband's death, she became an advocate for his legacy through her books and lectures. Her decades of campaigning on his behalf led to the public perception of General Custer as the "gallant fallen hero" and the canonization of Custer's Last Stand in American history for almost a century after his death.

Elizabeth Custer never remarried and died in 1933, four days short of her 91st birthday.

== Early years ==
Elizabeth "Libbie" Bacon was born in 1842 in Monroe, Michigan. She was the daughter of Daniel S. Bacon, a wealthy and influential judge and state representative. Her father also had profitable investments in real estate and other business ventures.

Tragedy marked much of her childhood, including the death of her mother and three siblings before turning 13. Since she was the sole surviving offspring of her father, he doted on her, having been charged by his dying wife to "be both a mother and father" to the young girl. Around 10 years later, Judge Bacon stated: "I have ever felt the force of these words... I feel the responsibility beyond anything in my life before or since."

Elizabeth Bacon was viewed as both beautiful and intelligent; she graduated from a girls' seminary in June 1862 at the head of her class. Her father hoped she would make a good marriage with a man from her own elevated social status, and she rejected several suitors.

She had briefly encountered her future husband George Armstrong Custer during her childhood, and socially met him again in the autumn of 1862, when he had returned to Monroe on leave from the first year of the American Civil War. He later wrote that he fell deeply in love with her as of their first formal meeting. She eventually returned these feelings, but her father refused to allow the then Captain Custer into the Bacon home or to permit her to meet him outside it, much less get married, when George proposed in the final week of 1862. He was from a poor, undistinguished family, and the judge hoped his daughter would have better than the life of an army wife. After Custer, just prior to the Battle of Gettysburg, was promoted to Brigadier General, Judge Bacon finally relented, and George and Elizabeth were married in Monroe at the First Presbyterian Church on February 9, 1864.

== Married life ==
Elizabeth Custer and her husband George had a loving but tumultuous relationship. Both were stubborn, opinionated, and ambitious. Their private correspondence was filled with sexually charged double entendres.

... we gave ourselves the privilege of a swift gallop... I never noticed the surroundings until I found we were almost in the midst of an Indian village, quite hidden under the bluff. My heart literally stood still. I watched the general furtively. He was as usual perfectly unmoved, and yet he well knew that this was the country where it was hardly considered that the Indian was overburdened with hospitality. ...

The next day the general thought I might rather not go with him than run the risk of such frights; but I well knew there was something far worse than fears for my own personal safety. It is infinitely worse to be left behind, a prey to all the horrors of imagining what may be happening to one we love. You eat your heart slowly out with such anxiety, and to endure such suspense is simply the hardest of all trials that come to the soldier's wife.

— Elizabeth 'Libbie' Custer, from her first book Boots and Saddles, on her life and adventures with her husband.

After the war, George reverted from his wartime rank of major general to his Regular Army rank of Captain, although he did receive a brevet (honorary) promotion to major general which allowed him to wear the uniform and insignia of that rank. He was promoted from Captain to Lt. Colonel and second in command to the newly formed 7th US Cavalry Regiment.

He was by default the Commander of the 7th US Cavalry as the Colonel was away on assignment.

He was assigned to a series of dreary and unsatisfying assignments in Texas, Kansas, and the Dakota Territory. Life on the frontier outposts was difficult, and his career was plagued by problems including a court-martial (brought about by his having left the field to be with his wife) in 1867.

After Custer took Mo-nah-se-tah, daughter of a Cheyenne chief as his concubine, Elizabeth managed to accept this relationship. Even as her letters suggest that she was not always opposed to share her husband with another woman.

The 1876 campaign against the Sioux seemed like a chance for glory to George Armstrong Custer. The couple's final home together was at Fort Abraham Lincoln near what is now Bismarck, North Dakota. From there, the general led the Seventh Cavalry in pursuit of Sitting Bull, Crazy Horse and the Sioux and Northern Cheyenne who refused to be confined to the reservation system.

== Defender of her husband's legacy ==
After her husband and 5 of the 12 companies of the 7th Cavalry were wiped out at the Battle of the Little Bighorn in June 1876, many in the press, Army, and government criticized him for having blundered into a massacre. President Ulysses S. Grant publicly blamed him for the disaster. Fearing that her husband would be made a scapegoat by history, Elizabeth Custer launched a one-woman campaign to rehabilitate her husband's image. Her assistance to Frederick Whittaker, the author of the first biography of George, helped enable the rapid production of the popular book, which praised George's career and set the tone for future biographers in the decades that followed.

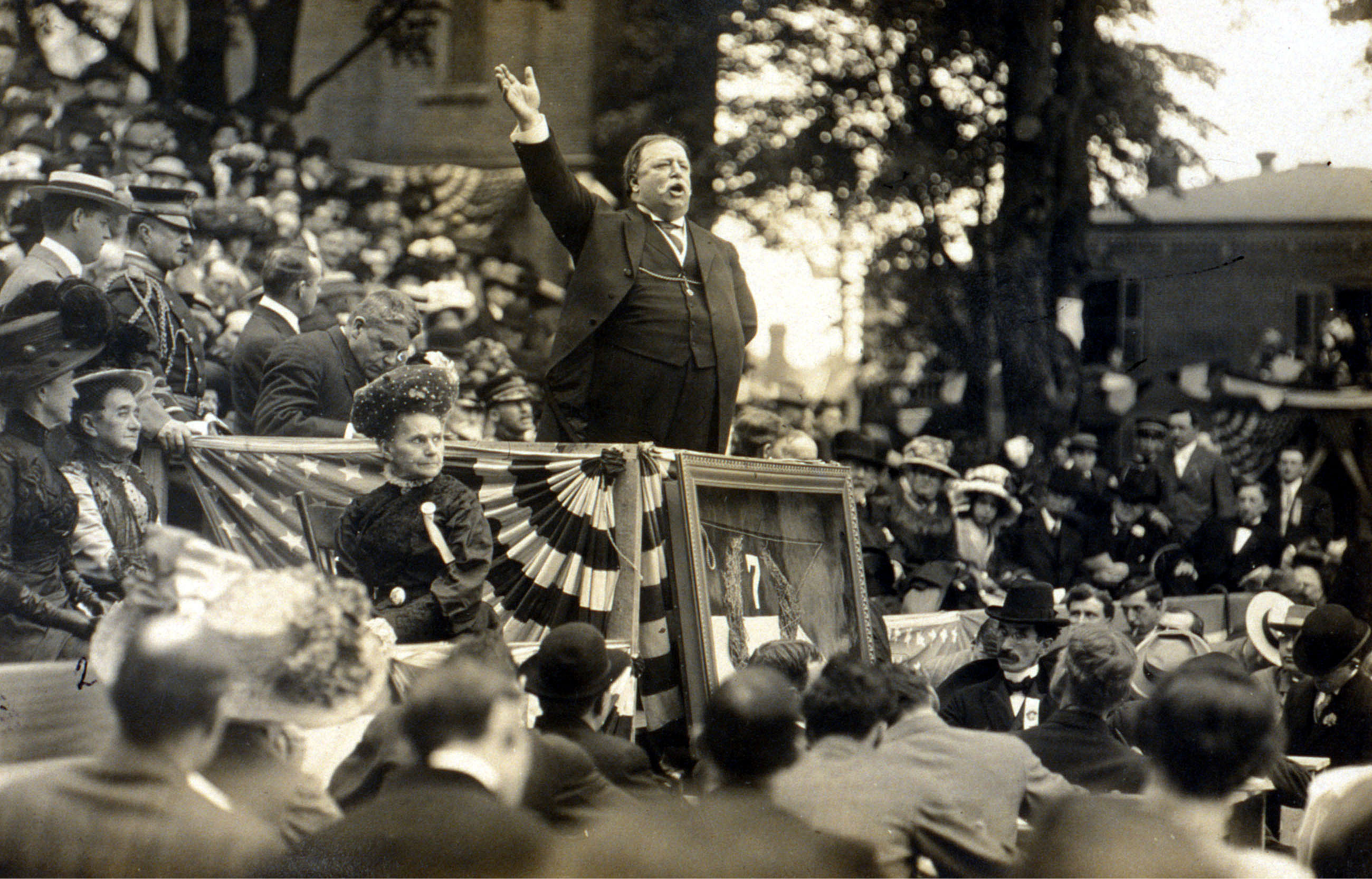
An elderly Elizabeth, seen looking at President Taft in black hat and dress on the farthest left of the image, attends the unveiling of the Custer statue in Monroe, Michigan, in 1910.

Elizabeth began writing articles and making speaking engagements praising the glory of what she presented as her "martyred" husband. Her three books—Boots and Saddles (1885), Tenting on the Plains—(1887), and Following the Guidon (1890), while historically accurate, were clearly aimed at glorifying her husband's memory and were ultimately slanted in George's favor.

Elizabeth remained utterly devoted to her husband and never remarried. Despite having spent her life traveling extensively throughout the United States (including winters in Florida) and the world, she never visited the Little Bighorn River valley. She was said to treasure a letter from President Theodore Roosevelt who stated that her husband was "one of my heroes" and "a shining light to all the youth of America." In later decades, historians reexamined George's actions leading up to and during the battle and found much to criticize.

After an initial period of distress dealing with her late husband's debts, Elizabeth spent over a half-century of widowhood in financial comfort attained as the result of her literary career and lecture tours. She left an estate of over $100,000 ($2.49 million in 2025) when she died in New York City, aged 90, on April 4, 1933, and was buried next to her husband at West Point. A few years before her death she told a writer that her greatest disappointment was that she never had a son to bear her husband's honored name.

== Portrayals in movies and television ==
Elizabeth Custer was portrayed by actress Olivia de Havilland in the 1941 film They Died with Their Boots On, by Mary Ure in the 1967 film Custer of the West, by Blythe Danner in the 1977 television movie The Court-Martial of George Armstrong Custer, and by Rosanna Arquette in the 1991 television miniseries Son of the Morning Star.
