= List of Three's Company episodes =

Three's Company is an American sitcom that aired from 1977 to 1984 on ABC. It is based on the British sitcom Man About the House.

== Series overview ==
Season	Episodes	Originally released		Rank	Rating
Season	Episodes	First released	Last released	Rank	Rating
1	6	March 15, 1977	April 21, 1977	11	23.1
2	25	September 13, 1977	May 16, 1978	3	28.3
3	22	September 12, 1978	May 8, 1979	2	30.3
4	25	September 11, 1979	May 6, 1980	2	26.3
5	22	October 28, 1980	May 19, 1981	8	22.4 (Note: Tied with House Calls.)
6	28	October 6, 1981	May 18, 1982	4	23.3
7	22	September 28, 1982	May 10, 1983	6	21.2
8	22	September 27, 1983	September 18, 1984	33	16.8

== Episodes ==
=== Season 1 (1977) ===
Two early versions of the pilot were recorded in March and November 1976 and never aired. The season-one episodes that aired were recorded from January to March 1977.

No. overall	No. in season	Title	Directed by	Written by	Original release date	Prod. code
1	1	"A Man About the House"	Bill Hobin	Bernie West	March 15, 1977	0101
Brunette Janet Wood, who works in a flower shop, and blonde Chrissy Snow, a guileless secretary, find Jack Tripper asleep in their bathtub full of water the morning after a going-away party/shotgun wedding reception for their ex-roommate Eleanor Garvey-Phillips. The two girls, who lack culinary skills, decide to share the apartment and expenses with Jack when they learn he is studying to be a gourmet chef who is staying at the YMCA and has no place to stay. However, first they must find a way to overcome objections from their landlord, Stanley Roper and his wife Helen, a romantically dysfunctional couple who live downstairs. Stanley refuses to allow males and females to live together unmarried, so Janet comes up with an idea that leads the Ropers to believe that Jack is gay, thus allowing him to live with the girls. This pilot episode is based on the pilot episode "Three's a Crowd!" from the British series Man About the House, written by Johnnie Mortimer and Brian Cooke. Recording date: January 28, 1977
2	2	"And Mother Makes Four"	Bill Hobin	Bernie West	March 24, 1977	0102
While Jack is moving in to share the apartment with Janet and Chrissy, Chrissy's mother calls and informs Chrissy that she will be there in moments. Chrissy, whose father is a minister, panics at the news that her mother is coming. To keep the situation under control, Chrissy asks Janet to take Jack to the Regal Beagle, the neighborhood pub, and keep him there until Mrs. Snow leaves. As the evening progresses, Chrissy's mother decides to spend the night, creating a dilemma for a tired Jack. Meanwhile, Mrs. Roper figures out that Jack isn't gay but promises to keep this secret from Mr. Roper. This episode is based on the episode of the same name from Man About the House. Recording date: February 4, 1977
3	3	"Roper's Niece"	Bill Hobin	Paul Wayne	March 31, 1977	0106
When Mrs. Roper accuses Mr. Roper of showing his visiting niece Karen (Christina Hart) a boring time, Mr. Roper--feeling comfortable with Jack's supposed homosexuality--decides to introduce Karen to Jack. Meanwhile, Jack is involved in organizing a birthday celebration for Janet, so when Mr. Roper suggests to Jack that he would like Jack to take his niece out, Jack refuses, saying he couldn't leave Janet on her birthday. When Mr. Roper leaves, Jack also admits to Janet and Chrissy that he can imagine what any niece of Mr. Roper's would look like, convinced that she would be unattractive as well. But when Mr. Roper brings Karen to meet Jack, he is surprised to find she is beautiful. Jack then asks Karen out and tells Janet and Chrissy that they will be back in time for the party. However, Jack does not show up at the appointed time, making Janet and Chrissy angry--leading them to realize that they are actually jealous. Recording date: March 8, 1977
4	4	"No Children, No Dogs"	Bill Hobin	Paul Wayne	April 7, 1977	0105
Jack wants to adopt a puppy but Janet and Chrissy remind him that Mr. Roper does not allow pets on the premises. While the trio tries to hide the puppy from Mr. Roper, Jack fails in attempts to give the little pooch away. Chrissy gets an idea when Mrs. Roper mentions that her husband will forget their approaching 20th wedding anniversary. First appearance of Richard Kline as the trio's neighbor and Jack's best friend Larry Dallas. Also, this episode is based on the episode of the same name from Man About the House. Recording date: February 28, 1977
5	5	"Jack the Giant Killer"	Bill Hobin	Larry Balmagia	April 14, 1977	0104
While the trio takes a break from weekend chores at the Regal Beagle; Jeff, a large chap, approaches their table to make a rude play for Chrissy. His size intimidates Jack, and the situation becomes more embarrassing for him when the Ropers drop in and Mr. Roper, ill-tempered from a toothache, puts Jeff in his place. But Jack feels he may have acted cowardly by avoiding a fight. This episode is based on the episode "Colour Me Yellow" from Man About the House. Recording date: February 18, 1977
6	6	"It's Only Money"	Bill Hobin	Paul Wayne	April 21, 1977	0103
The trio, believing a burglar has stolen their rent money, frantically try to avoid Mr. Roper until they can replace it. After Jack and Janet find their apartment door unlocked and the cash missing, Chrissy arrives and insists that she left the envelope containing the rent money on a shelf. Jack then calls the police; and while the trio worries about trying to get a loan, Mrs. Roper convinces her husband to invite them out to dinner. Mr. Roper tells the trio that he stopped by to do a repair, and collected the money to pay the rent (but forgot to leave a receipt). This episode is based on the episode of the same name from Man About the House. Also, this episode marks the first appearance of Dean Travers (William Pierson), the often-uptight dean of Jack's cooking school. Guest star: Joey Forman as the policeman. Recording date: February 11, 1977

=== Season 2 (1977–78) ===
No. overall	No. in season	Title	Directed by	Written by	Original release date	Prod. code
7	1	"Ground Rules"	Bill Hobin & Michael Ross	Sam Gary	September 13, 1977	0204
A conflict over lack of privacy comes to a head after Janet brings home a date, and Jack and Chrissy have to cool their heels at the Regal Beagle. While at the Regal Beagle (where the Ropers also are spending the evening), Jack makes a date with a beautiful girl, Veronica. Later, Janet becomes furious when Jack and Chrissy choose an inopportune moment to barge into the apartment where she is entertaining her date, Alex. Later, the trio agrees to an "unbreakable rule" on taking turns privately using the apartment for dates. Jack soon regrets this rule when Veronica calls to change their date night. This episode is based on the episode "Love and Let Love" from Man About the House.
8	2	"Jack Looks for a Job"	Bill Hobin	Don Nicholl, Michael Ross & Bernie West	September 20, 1977	0201
While Janet and Chrissy are both employed, Jack has a problem finding work to fit around his school hours. Jack's principles are at stake when he is hired as a male model and learns he is to pose nude for a magazine centerfold, so he quits. Jack then sells encyclopedias as an alternative. He makes mistakes on the form when trying to sell to Mr. Roper, so he quits and gets a job as a waiter at a pizza parlor. John Fiedler and Sally Kirkland guest star. First episode taped at CBS Television City, where the show would be produced for the next 5 seasons. This episode is based on the episode "A Little Knowledge" from Man About the House.
9	3	"Janet's Promotion"	Bill Hobin	Story by : Paul Wayne & George Burditt	September 27, 1977	0205
When the manager of the flower shop where Janet works resigns, Jack and Chrissy convince Janet that she should put herself in line for the position. But the owner of the shop has other ideas, and hires a woman named Chloe for the manager's position, whose only qualification is her figure. Janet decides to fight fire with fire, and announces that she's going to have breast implants. Although Jack and Chrissy try to talk Janet out of it; the only person who gets through to her is Chloe, who visits to explain that she's resigning the job because the only thing the boss is interested in is her body, and she wishes she was more like Janet, whom Chloe admires for her competence. Guest Stars: Sandra de Bruin as Chloe, J.J. Barry as Compton and Margaret Wheeler as Woman Customer.
10	4	"Strange Bedfellows"	Bill Hobin	Story by : Alan J. Levitt; Teleplay by : Paul Wayne & George Burditt	October 4, 1977	0203
Chrissy and Janet go to San Diego for the weekend, leaving Jack alone. Jack throws a big, noisy party. When Mr. Roper comes upstairs to complain, Jack and one of his female guests entice him in to join the revelry. The next morning the girls return to find the apartment in shambles and Jack in bed with someone. That someone turns out to be Mr. Roper, who is mortified to find himself in Jack's bed. Although Jack knows that the only explanation is that both he and Mr. Roper must have passed out from having too much to drink, Mr. Roper cannot remember a thing and is afraid of the implication of himself being in Jack's bed. It takes Celise, a woman who was at the party, to give them the real story, but not before Jack confessed to the distraught Mr. Roper that he is not really gay. Mr. Roper does not believe Jack, but appreciates Jack 'lying' to make him feel better. The second half of the episode contains a few continuity errors due to the fact that two different tapings were edited together for the final release. The noticeable errors are: one or two yellow cans on the top right-hand side of the shelf in front of the window, one or two suitcases by the front door, and the changing look of Mr. Roper's collar on his shirt.
11	5	"Chrissy's Date"	Bill Hobin	Don Nicholl, Michael Ross & Bernie West	October 11, 1977	0202
Jack and Janet feel compelled to inform Chrissy that Lloyd Cross (Dick Sargent), a mature, sophisticated man she is dating, happens to be married. Janet had confronted Jack about being jealous of Lloyd, who is dining at the apartment with Chrissy, when they run into the Ropers at the Regal Beagle. Mrs. Roper reveals that she knows Lloyd's wife, which sends Jack and Janet rushing back to the apartment to break up Chrissy's romance. To convince Chrissy that he is telling the truth, Jack takes Chrissy to meet Lloyd's wife (Joyce Bulifant). This episode is based on the episode "In Praise of Older Men" from Man About the House.
12	6	"Alone Together"	Bill Hobin & Michael Ross	Bryan Joseph	October 25, 1977	0209
Mr. Roper goes on a business trip to check out some desert real estate, leaving Mrs. Roper all alone. She convinces Janet to come stay with her overnight, leaving Chrissy and Jack alone in the apartment. Afraid that Jack can't be trusted, Janet warns Chrissy to play down her natural attractiveness. Although Chrissy does her utmost to follow Janet's instructions--appearing in a sloppy bathrobe and hair curlers--Jack only finds her more appealing as her natural self. When Janet returns in the morning she finds the remains of an apparent romantic dinner for two, a distraught Chrissy and an elated Jack. What Janet thinks has happened is hardly the case, however. Jack's crime is that he did not made a pass at Chrissy; and because of it, Chrissy is afraid she's losing her sex appeal. With Janet as intermediary, Jack explains that he's a one-woman man, and right now he has a girlfriend; otherwise, he would certainly have made a move on Chrissy.
13	7	"Roper's Car"	Bill Hobin	Alan J. Levitt	November 1, 1977	0206
Jack learns that Mr. Roper has agreed by phone to sell his 20-year-old car to a used car dealer. Jack convinces Janet and Chrissy that they should buy it, since Mr. Roper is selling it so cheaply. Although Mrs. Roper chides Mr. Roper about going back on his word to the dealer, Mr. Wagstaff, Mr. Roper takes the trio's offer of slightly more cash. The car leads to nothing but trouble for the trio: first, they cannot work out a system of sharing the car, and then it turns out that the car will cost them more than they paid for it just to make it roadworthy. Meanwhile, after Mr. Roper informs Wagstaff that the car is a 1957 Chevy, he informs Mr. Roper that the car is a classic, and that Mr. Roper could have gotten $1200 for it, which infuriates Mr. Roper. Mr. Roper then cons the trio into selling the car back to him for what they paid, but he still loses out; because it turns out the supposed 1957 Chevy is actually a 1958 model, since Mr. Roper bought it in the fall of 1957 and it was a new model for 1958; and therefore, Wagstaff rescinds his offer.
14	8	"Cyrano De Tripper"	Bill Hobin & Michael Ross	Paul Wayne & George Burditt	November 8, 1977	0210
Chrissy coaxes Jack into secretly preparing dinner for her and her new boyfriend Michael, a gourmet chef whom she told that she can cook. Burning with jealousy, Jack hides out in the kitchen and listens to Chrissy's boyfriend both praise and criticize his cooking, while also making advances to Chrissy. One criticism too many brings Jack stomping out of the kitchen, blowing the fuse and infuriating Chrissy. Jack and Michael then get into a heated argument until Michael reveals that he's friendly with one of the world's greatest chefs, and Jack suddenly looks on Michael with admiration. Meanwhile, Mr. Roper has been putting two and two together and has decided that Jack is not gay. He storms down to the trio's apartment just in time to find Chrissy alone in the living room furious with Jack for "stealing her date," and finds Jack and Michael huddled over the stove comparing notes; which--aware of Jack's supposed homosexuality--relieves Mr. Roper.
15	9	"Chrissy's Night Out"	Bill Hobin	Story by : Phil Hahn; Teleplay by : Phil Hahn and Stuart Gillard	November 15, 1977	0207
Jack and Janet panic when they discover that Chrissy has not returned home from an evening out with the girls from the office. When Chrissy finally arrives at after three in the morning, she is in tears because a "cute guy" she met at the Funky Fox bar (James Cromwell) had mistaken her friendliness for something else. A few minutes later the "cute guy" arrives at the apartment, and before he has a chance to identify himself as Detective Lannigan of the vice squad; Jack, in an angry burst of protectiveness, punches him - knocking him to the ground. Lannigan comes to and arrests Jack for assaulting a police officer. When Mr. Roper tells Lannigan he has been punched by a fairy, Lannigan decides his reputation would be better off if he bends the law and lets Jack go free.
16	10	"Stanley Casanova"	Bill Hobin & Michael Ross	Gary Belkin	November 22, 1977	0211
Dejected because Mrs. Roper told him that women do not find him attractive, Mr. Roper goes to the Regal Beagle where Jack is filling in as bartender for the evening. A sympathetic Jack promises Joan, a pretty girl at the pub, that he will take her to dinner the next evening if she will sit with Mr. Roper and feign interest in him to boost his ego. Mr. Roper is thoroughly enjoying himself until Chrissy and Janet arrive with Mrs. Roper in tow just in time to see him getting a kiss from Joan. Mrs. Roper quickly leaves, totally crushed; but when the girls tell Mr. Roper he has been found out, he is triumphant. Mrs. Roper is ready to leave Mr. Roper until Jack reveals he set the whole thing up, and Mrs. Roper decides the best thing for their marriage is that she let him go on thinking he is a heartbreaker, even if she knows the truth.
17	11	"Janet's High School Sweetheart"	Bill Hobin	Dixie Brown Grossman	November 29, 1977	0213
Janet runs into Peter, an old high school classmate and popular student whom she used to have a crush on. When Janet invites Peter for a visit, Jack and Chrissy are amazed at how nervous their usually strong roommate is as she waits for Peter to arrive. When they meet him, Jack is impressed but Chrissy spots him immediately for what he is--a real Don Juan. While Jack and Chrissy are at the Regal Beagle; Janet is at home fending off Peter's advances, and becoming more disenchanted, Peter chases Janet into the bedroom and hits his head on a table, knocking himself unconscious. Just as Chrissy and Jack arrive home to find Janet a mess from Peter attacking her, Peter comes to and starts another attempt on Janet. Chrissy comes to Janet's rescue and holds Janet protectively, making Peter come to the conclusion that the reason Janet is not interested in him is that she and Chrissy have something going. Jack then kicks him out.
18	12	"Jack's Uncle"	Bill Hobin	Story by : Mike Marmer; Teleplay by : Paul Wayne & George Burditt	December 6, 1977	0212
In the midst of the trio's panic over Jack's inability to come up with his share of the rent, Jack's Uncle Fremont arrives for a visit. He thoroughly charms Chrissy and Janet, but Jack warns them not to be too charmed because Fremont Tripper has a habit of buying gifts for people by writing bad checks. No sooner does he reveal this problem, Mr. Roper shows up demanding the rent, and Fremont generously writes Mr. Roper a check for $100, the shortfall the trio needed to defray the rent. The trio then tries to retrieve the check by sneaking into the Ropers' apartment while Roper is asleep on the couch but Jack gets caught in the act. Meanwhile, Fremont is telling Mrs. Roper about his talent for investing, and Mrs. Roper convinces Mr. Roper that he should invest as well; all he needs is $100 to buy into Fremont's latest scheme. Mr. Roper then gives Fremont the check. Since Jack is still angry, Fremont decides to leave; but when his wealthy lady friend arrives with an offer to give him marriage and security, Fremont opts for his freedom.
19	13	"Helen's Job"	Bill Hobin	Paul Wayne & George Burditt	December 13, 1977	0208
Janet and Chrissy get involved in a squabble between the Ropers over Mrs. Roper's allowance, taking Mrs. Roper's threat to find a job as a sign of feminist enlightenment. Despite Mr. Roper's warning that she's forbidden to work, Helen takes a job Janet had arranged for her at a cafeteria, where the manager is an acquaintance of Janet's. Mr. Roper's first day of work turns out to be a disaster, and Janet and Chrissy regret their probing. Jack then decides to take over and straighten things out. He tells Mr. Roper that his wife loves her new job, and that he had better beg her to come back home before it's too late. Unfortunately, when Mr. Roper comes to convince Mrs. Roper to give it up, she lays it on a little too thick and tells Mr. Roper that she has been given a raise. Money suddenly is more important to Mr. Roper than having a wife at home until Mrs. Roper points out to him it will cost him more in expenses than she would be bringing home.
20	14	"Three's Christmas"	Bill Hobin	Don Nicholl, Michael Ross & Bernie West	December 20, 1977	0214
The trio decides to celebrate Christmas at home because they have not been invited to any parties--not even by their neighbors, the Stevens, who hosts a big party every Christmas. After finding this out, the Ropers invite the trio downstairs for their own party, and they accept; but shortly after, the Stevens call to reconfirm their invitation to the party, which must have gotten lost in the mail. Jack and Janet want to go; but Chrissy, honoring the Ropers' invitation, makes them go to their party instead. The evening is spent listening to Mr. Roper sing silly songs, until finally the trio is able to excuse themselves. They go to the Stevens' party, where they unexpectedly run into the Ropers, who found out that they received a belated invitation as well. Turns out that Mr. Roper had spent the evening trying to bore the trio into leaving so he and Mrs. Roper could go to the party. This episode is based on the 1973 Man About the House Christmas Special.
21	15	"The Gift"	Bill Hobin	Paul Wayne & George Burditt	January 3, 1978	0215
Jack interrupts an argument between the Ropers over money and suggests a compromise: Mr. Roper should buy his wife the expensive mink coat she wants rather than a trip to Las Vegas. Jack then offers to pick up the coat for Mr. Roper at a store where he can get a discount. Jack brings the coat home and leaves it on the couch for a moment. At that very moment; Chrissy arrives, angry at Jack for forgetting her birthday--until she discovers the gift-wrapped box. Before Jack can stop her, she unwraps the coat, assuming it's for her despite the fact that it's much too big. Chrissy's overjoyment doesn't allow Jack to get a word in to explain it's actually Mrs. Roper's coat. Jack then tells Mr. Roper what happened, but Mr. Roper insists on having the coat back immediately. Then Mrs. Roper informs him she doesn't want it anymore because Chrissy has one after seeing her wear it. So now, Mr. Roper just wants his $300 back.
22	16	"The Rivals"	Bill Hobin	Story by : Bernie Kahn; Teleplay by : Charles Stewart	January 10, 1978	0217
Janet asks Chrissy to help her entertain an important business prospect, whom she assumes is a boring old man. When he arrives at the apartment, she is surprised that he is young and handsome. Jack leaves, and Janet is disappointed that the businessman is not attracted to her, but takes a liking to Chrissy instead. Janet is angry with Chrissy for coming onto him, but Chrissy does not see what she could have done wrong. Jack returns and helps the girls become friends again by helping Janet see that Chrissy was just being her usual chatty self. The businessman makes a large order of flowers from Janet.
23	17	"The Baby Sitters"	Sam Gary	Don Nicholl, Michael Ross & Bernie West	January 17, 1978	0216
Jack and Chrissy agree to take over Janet's babysitting job for a night. To their dismay, they are met with a crying baby, no TV, and a locked liquor cabinet. To make matters worse, the mother goes into labor with her second baby that evening, and her husband faints, so both are hospitalized, stranding Jack and Chrissy overnight. When Janet stops by in the morning to check on them, the baby's grandmother arrives at the house a moment later, putting Janet to work on morning preparations for the child, allowing Jack and Chrissy to slip out. This episode is based on the episode "Two Foot Two, Eyes of Blue" from Man About the House.
24	18	"Home Movies"	Bill Hobin	Don Nicholl, Michael Ross & Bernie West	January 24, 1978	0218
Chrissy's new boyfriend, an aspiring filmmaker, gets her interested in making movies and her parents send her a 8mm movie camera. Larry wants to use Chrissy's projector to screen a porno film he purchased for $50 from a stranger, which Jack and Mr. Roper want to view. When Chrissy, Janet and Mrs. Roper arrive at the apartment to see what they think is Chrissy's movie, it turns out that Larry has been conned into buying a Woody Woodpecker cartoon. This episode is based on the episode "The Last Picture Show" from Man About the House.
25	19	"Jack in the Flower Shop"	Bill Hobin	Ziggy Steinberg, Paul Wayne & George Burditt	January 31, 1978	0219
The flower shop is understaffed, so Janet hires unemployed Jack to work there. Their friendship is put to the test when Jack's relaxed, jokey attitude clashes with Janet's more hard-nosed work ethic, a clash that carries over into their home life. When Janet's boss Mr. Compton discovers that Janet missed an order for a wedding, Jack - to make amends with Janet - pretends that it was his fault that the flowers were not delivered. Mr. Compton fires Jack, but his friendship with Janet is mended and he is pleased to no longer be bossed around by her. Mrs. Roper orders flowers and chocolates to be delivered to her at their apartment from 'a secret admirer'. She wants to make Mr. Roper jealous by making it seem like another man is attempting to woo her. He finds out from the delivery boy that she sent them to herself. Mr. Roper gives a bunch of flowers to his wife, which she is initially pleased with. However, she finds out from the card in them that he stole them from a grave. Guest starring: Natalie Schafer as a customer in the flower shop.
26	20	"Jack's Navy Pal"	Bill Hobin	Story by : Alan J. Levitt, Paul Wayne & George Burditt; Teleplay by : Paul Wayne & George Burditt	February 7, 1978	0220
Janet tells Jack and Chrissy that Mr. Roper has increased the rent of another of his tenants by $75 per month. They are worried that he will also raise their rent, so Jack decides that if they are nice to him, he will think of them as family and will not do so. The trio plan a dinner for the Ropers. They accept the invitation. Mr. Roper realizes the trio's motive, and decides that he is going to raise their rent by $75. Chrissy takes a phone call and tells Jack that it was a friend of his, Jim (David Dukes), who knew him in the Navy and that she has invited him over. Jack is horrified, telling Chrissy that Jim has never been his friend and that no-one in the Navy liked Jim because he was violent. When Jim arrives, Jack is surprised that he is now blind. Jim punches Jack in the jaw. The Ropers arrive. Jim deliberately breaks many things in the apartment and will not leave until Jack hits him. Jack tries to hit him, but Jim blocks his punch, hits Jack, then leaves. Janet asks Mr. Roper about the rent. Mr. Roper says that he is not going to raise their rent, but they will have to pay for the furniture that Jim broke.
27	21	"Will the Real Jack Tripper..."	Bill Hobin & Michael Ross	Don Nicholl, Michael Ross & Bernie West	February 14, 1978	0221
Larry brags to Jack that he never gives his dates his real name. When a woman named Sandra phones Larry, asking for 'Jack Tripper,' Larry hangs up. Sandra arrives at the apartment, where she tells Janet and Chrissy that she is pregnant by Jack. After Chrissy and Janet confront him, Jack assumes it was his girlfriend Linda who came to the apartment, so he proposes to her - which she accepts. Jack is puzzled when Janet and Chrissy react badly to him bringing Linda to the apartment and informing them of their engagement. Larry confesses that he used Jack's name when he was with Sandra. Jack is pleased when Linda decides against marrying him. Sandra phones the Reagle Beagle looking for 'Jack'. Larry answers, and Sandra tells him that she was mistaken in regard to being pregnant, and that her father is going to confront him. The father arrives at the apartment while Mr. Roper is fixing a window, and angrily chases him around the room, assuming he is 'Jack'. This episode is based on the episode "Never Give Your Real Name" from Man About the House.
28	22	"Days of Beer and Weeds"	Bill Hobin	Don Nicholl, Michael Ross & Bernie West	February 21, 1978	0222
The trio sacrifices a weekend to clean the Ropers' garden, after he threatens to raise their rent if they do not. They find some attractive weeds, some of which Mrs. Roper uses in her plant which she enters in a flower-arranging contest sponsored by her flower arranging class. Larry comes to the apartment and says that the leaves they have are from cannabis plants. They call the Ropers, who are at the contest. Mr. Roper deliberately damages Mrs. Roper's plant that is about to be judged in order to prevent it being examined. This infuriates Mrs. Roper. She becomes even more furious when her teacher comes around for the judging and informs her that the weeds were not marijuana weeds after all. Janet confirms that, then says that some of the other leaves that they have are cannabis. Guest Starring: David Tress as desk sergeant and Ludi Claire as flower judge. This episode is based on the episode "How Does Your Garden Grow?" from Man About the House.
29	23	"Chrissy Come Home"	Bill Hobin	Story by : Joyce Burditt, Mort Scharfman & Harvey Weitzman; Teleplay by : Joyce & George Burditt	February 28, 1978	0223
Chrissy's father Reverend Snow (Peter Mark Richman) visits. Chrissy has not told him that Eleanor has moved out or mentioned Jack. Chrissy and Janet pretend that they are the apartment's only residents and he is not told who Jack is. Chrissy accidentally reveals that Jack lives there, so Janet pretends he is her husband. When Jack says they married at the city hall, Rev. Snow insists on marrying them in a religious service in the apartment on that day. Chrissy tells her father the truth about their living situation, to which he angrily demands she move back home. He changes his mind when he realizes how much Jack and Janet care about his daughter. First appearance of Peter Mark Richman as Reverend Snow, Chrissy's father.
30	24	"Bird Song"	Bill Hobin	Don Nicholl, Michael Ross & Bernie West	May 9, 1978	0224
Jack and Chrissy take turns sucking up to Janet, who acquired a pair of tickets to a Frank Sinatra concert which she is not going to attend. The trio is also entrusted to take care of a parakeet that Mr. Roper bought as a gift for his wife. Jack unintentionally sits on the box that contains the bird. After frantically thinking of ways to get out of the jam, the trio gives Mrs. Roper the Sinatra tickets, claiming they were the gift from Mr. Roper--much to his surprise. Chrissy then says that she let the parakeet out of the box to fly around the bathroom. This episode is based on the episode "Come Fly with Me!" from Man About the House.
31	25	"Coffee, Tea or Jack"	Bill Hobin	Madeline Di Maggio Wagner & Kathy Donnell	May 16, 1978	0225
An old flame of Jack's, flight attendant Susan Walters (Loni Anderson), with whom he had an on-again, off-again relationship, comes to the apartment. Jack is delighted and takes Susan to the Regal Beagle. Chrissy and Janet are horrified at the power Susan has over Jack and the prospect of what life would be like for them if Jack were to move out. At Janet's suggestion, Chrissy attempts to persuade Jack to ditch Susan so that she can get him to his surprise birthday party which is being hosted by the Ropers. Jack tells Chrissy to leave the pub; soon after, he is disappointed when a pilot who is involved with Susan turns up. Janet and Chrissy go to the Ropers', where Jack and Susan later arrive together. Jack is tired of Susan turning her affection towards him on and off, so he pretends that he will marry her tomorrow, in a plan to scare her off. Jack, Chrissy and Janet are pleased when the ruse works and she leaves.

=== Season 3 (1978–79) ===
No. overall	No. in season	Title	Directed by	Written by	Original release date	Prod. code
32	1	"Double Date"	Dave Powers	Bob Baublitz	September 12, 1978	0302
Jack fakes a cold to get out of a date with Linda, in order to go on a date with Samantha. When Linda shows up to nurse the ailing Jack, both girls become angry and leave. Meanwhile, Mr. Roper claims to have contracted Jack's cold to get out of taking Helen to dinner.
33	2	"Good Old Reliable Janet"	Dave Powers	Roger Shulman & John Baskin	September 19, 1978	0301
Jack and Mr. Roper are delighted when nude protesters take over the local beach. Chrissy wants to join them, but Janet won't go. The gang abandons 'reliable' Janet to wait for the phone repairman while they go out to eat with Larry. Mrs. Roper is furious when she realizes Mr. Roper has been ogling the nude sunbathers. The pair decide to join the protestors to show they can be free spirits. When the police raid the protest, Helen and Janet are forced to run home naked and hide in the bushes to wait for their friends.
34	3	"The Love Diary"	Dave Powers	Deborah Hwang & Gary Belkin	September 26, 1978	0304
Chrissy is hired to type a diary written by "Wanda X". The diary includes her sexual liaisons with men and her desire for an older married man who lives in the apartment below. Mr. Roper visits to shampoo their carpet and notices the open diary. After reading a couple of pages, he wrongly assumes that it is Chrissy's diary. Mr. Roper tells his wife, who laughs. When the couple visit, Mr. Roper ineptly flirts with Chrissy. Jack realises how the misunderstanding occurred. They explain the situation to the Ropers, who then leave. "Wanda" visits; he is an old man called Clarence who uses a pen name.
35	4	"The Fast"	Dave Powers	Story by : Richard Christian Matheson & Thomas E. Szollosi; Teleplay by : Al Gordon & Jack Mendelsohn	October 3, 1978	0305
Janet wagers with Jack and Chrissy as to who can go longest without their greatest pleasure: women for Jack; food for Chrissy. Jack is confident that he will win the contest, but Janet has an ace up her sleeve: his sex buddy Grace, whom he finds irresistible, is in town waiting for him in her hotel room. Jack wins, but injures his back - which makes him unable to have sex.
36	5	"Helen's Rendezvous"	Dave Powers	Jim Rogers	October 10, 1978	0306
Mr. Roper is angry with his best friend Jerry, because he failed to honor a wager by not buying Mr. Roper a beer after a bowling game that Mr. Roper won. Helen invites Jerry to come over in an attempt to mend fences, but Jerry thinks she is coming on to him, while the trio thinks Mrs. Roper is having an affair.
37	6	"My Sister's Keeper"	Dave Powers	Paul Wayne, George Burditt and Franelle Silver	October 17, 1978	0307
Janet's college-age sister Jenny (Devon Ericson) visits and Jack offers to show her around. Despite Janet's concerns, Jack is a complete gentleman. However, things take a turn when Jack, having been relocated to the couch rather than his own bedroom, takes some medication before sleeping and winds up back in his own bed with Jenny.
38	7	"Chrissy and the Guru"	Dave Powers	Story by : Don Nicholl, Michael Ross & Bernie West; Teleplay by : Paul Wayne & George Burditt	October 24, 1978	0303
Jack and Janet become concerned when Chrissy falls under the spell of Rama Mageesh (Michael Bell), a shady guru who seems more interested in Chrissy's more palpable attributes than in meditation.
39	8	"Larry's Bride"	Dave Powers	Martin Roth	October 31, 1978	0309
Larry brings his new fiancée Gloria (Cecilia Hart) to meet the trio. Jack is taken aback when Gloria reveals herself to Jack as an old high school classmate of his--and makes a pass at Jack in the kitchen. When Janet and Chrissy walk in on them, they accuse Jack of trying to steal her away from Larry, although he is innocent. In the end, Gloria leaves Larry when she discovers he is not the wealthy man she believed he was.
40	9	"Chrissy's New Boss"	Dave Powers	Al Gordon & Jack Mendelsohn	November 14, 1978	0308
Chrissy decides to be more assertive at work after being passed over for a promotion. Her assertiveness lands her the position of secretary for J.C. Braddock, but Jack and Janet fear that J.C. is only interested in Chrissy's physical attributes, especially since Chrissy is to accompany Braddock on a trip to Las Vegas. What they do not know is that J.C. Braddock is actually a woman. Guest Starring: Emmaline Henry as J.C. Braddock and Richard McKenzie as Chef Anton.
41	10	"The Crush"	Dave Powers	Al Gordon & Jack Mendelsohn	November 21, 1978	0311
Janet and Chrissy angrily blame Jack for sending them on a wild goose chase to a nonexistent party, never dreaming that it is the Ropers' teenage houseguest who wants them out of the way so she can have Jack all to herself. Guest Stars: Lauri Hendler as Laurie, Lois Hamilton as Rita as Steve Shaw as Albert.
42	11	"The Kleptomaniac"	Dave Powers	Story by : Don Nicholl, Michael Ross & Bernie West; Teleplay by : Paul Wayne & George Burditt	November 28, 1978	0312
Jack and Janet are shocked as evidence mounts that Chrissy seems compelled to steal, not only from them but also from the Ropers.
43	12	"The Party's Over"	Dave Powers	Don Nicholl, Michael Ross & Bernie West	December 5, 1978	0310
Not allowing any wild parties after last year's party got out of control, Mr. Roper plays such a dirty trick on the trio (he fakes a cancellation of the party by posting a sign in the lot) that his wife walks out on him. This episode is based on the episode of the same name from Man About the House.
44	13	"Eleanor's Return"	Dave Powers	Roger Shulman & John Baskin	December 12, 1978	0313
Jack believes Janet and Chrissy are going to kick him out of the apartment when their former--and recently-divorced--roommate Eleanor (Marianne Black) suddenly shows up at their door.
45	14	"The Older Woman"	Dave Powers	Paul Wayne & George Burditt	January 16, 1979	0315
Jack is dating a sophisticated older woman (Claudette Nevins), who is a niece of the Ropers and in town with her aunt Martha (Irene Tedrow), who is getting married. Janet and Chrissy think it is great when they learn that Jack is dating a "fantastic" older woman, but chaos ensues when the girls mistakenly think it is the elderly Martha whom Jack is dating.
46	15	"Stanley's Hotline"	Dave Powers	Sam Greenbaum	January 30, 1979	0316
Mr. Roper is repairing their bathroom sink's clogged drain pipe, which leads to the main drain pipe connecting to the bathroom sink of the trio's. While repairing the sink, Mr. Roper inadvertently hears a conversation coming from the trio's bathroom, which includes Chrissy saying she "wants to get rid of it." Misinterpreting this, Mr. Roper believes Chrissy is pregnant and wants an abortion, when actually she wants to get rid of a wart on her hand. This was the only episode that Joyce DeWitt does not appear in; Anne Schedeen guest stars as Linda, who fills in for Janet in this episode as the third member of the trio.
47	16	"The Catered Affair"	Dave Powers	Al Gordon & Jack Mendelsohn	February 6, 1979	0314
Chrissy calls on Jack to cater a party hosted by Chrissy's employer, with help from Janet and the Ropers. However, things get out of hand when Chrissy nearly loses her job and Jack tries to save her from the lecherous advances of the firm's president Mr. Penrose (Macon McCalman).
48	17	"The Best Laid Plans"	Dave Powers	Roger Shulman & John Baskin	February 13, 1979	0318
When Janet is terrified by a mouse in their bedroom, Jack takes advantage of the situation by offering to move in with Chrissy until the rodent is captured. This episode is based on the episode "Of Mice and Women" from Man About the House.
49	18	"The Harder They Fall"	Dave Powers	Story by : Susan Sisko; Teleplay by : Al Gordon & Jack Mendelsohn	February 20, 1979	0317
Janet invites a handsome man, Gregg Halliday ( Rod McCary ), to the apartment, and asks Jack and Chrissy to leave for the evening so that she may be alone with her date. However, Jack falls down the staircase outside, injuring his leg and having to be rushed to the hospital. Under doctor's orders, Jack has to be confined in bed until his leg heals. But expecting that she and her date will be alone, Janet--much to her surprise--finds Chrissy tending to Jack in his bedroom.
50	19	"The Bake-Off"	Dave Powers	Story by : Jerry Kenion; Teleplay by : Paul Wayne & George Burditt	February 27, 1979	0322
Chrissy inadvertently eats the pie that Jack entered in a statewide baking competition and then tries to substitute a ringer from the bakery. At the competition; Jack, out of honesty, reveals to Dean Travers about the incident, which leads to chaos that results in a free-for-all pie fight. Guest Stars: William Pierson and Leon Askin.
51	20	"An Anniversary Surprise"	Dave Powers	Roger Shulman & John Baskin	March 13, 1979	0320
Mrs. Roper and the trio mistakenly believe that Mr. Roper is having an affair. However, the supposed "other woman" is actually a real estate agent (Ruta Lee), who had been working with Mr. Roper to sell the building and find a new home in Cheviot Hills. This episode marks the departure of the Ropers to their own self-titled spin-off, whose first episode premiered after this episode on the same night.
52	21	"Jack Moves Out"	Dave Powers	Paul Wayne & George Burditt	May 8, 1979	0319
Fed up with the girls not doing their share and helping out at the apartment, Jack angrily leaves and becomes a live-in cook for Larry's boss (Jordan Charney) and his promiscuous wife (Cynthia Harris). Guest-starring: John Larroquette as an unnamed police officer; Jordan Charney as Larry's boss. Charney returned as a recurring guest later in the series as Jack's boss Mr. Angelino.
53	22	"Triangle Troubles"	Dave Powers	Al Gordon & Jack Mendelsohn	May 15, 1979	0321
Jack starts dating a new girl (Barrie Youngfellow) and they both have a difficult time trying to hide the fact that they live with two members of the opposite sex.

=== Season 4 (1979–80) ===
No. overall	No. in season	Title	Directed by	Written by	Original release date	Prod. code
54	1	"Jack on the Lam"	Dave Powers	Neil Lebowitz	September 11, 1979	0401
When FBI agents come to the apartment asking for Jack, he is convinced it is because he finagled an early discharge from the Navy and that they intend to send him back to finish his duty. To avoid them, Jack (in drag) poses as Chrissy, and ends up going on a date with the man who was to be Chrissy's date. Eventually, Jack works up the courage to reveal his actual self to the FBI agents, and truth comes into light when they actually only wanted Jack to act as a character reference for an old Navy friend of his, who applied for a federal job. Guest Stars: Dick O'Neill as Walter Nessle, James Staley as Special Agent Banning, Rudolph Willrich as Special Agent Roth and Paul Ainsley as Jim the Bartender.
55	2	"Love Thy Neighbor"	Dave Powers	Mark Tuttle	September 18, 1979	0402
Jack wants to raise money to buy a gift for Janet and Chrissy; so he takes Larry's place as a male escort and winds up with Lana Shields, an overly amorous older woman who falls hard for Jack. First appearance of Ann Wedgeworth as the trio's promiscuous neighbor Lana Shields.
56	3	"The New Landlord"	Dave Powers	Michael S. Baser & Kim Weiskopf	September 25, 1979	0403
Ralph Furley, the new landlord, gets off on the wrong foot with the trio when he introduces himself to Janet and Chrissy at the Regal Beagle, who mistakenly think he's making a rude play on them. The situation only worsens when the trio accidentally sells his furniture, thinking it was the Ropers' old furniture. Mr. Furley then gives the trio 24 hours to get out, until he meets (and falls for) Lana, who convinces him to let Jack and the girls stay. This episode marks the first appearance of Don Knotts as Ralph Furley, the trio's new landlord. He would remain with the cast for the remainder of the series' run.
57	4	"Snow Job"	Dave Powers	Rowby Goren	October 2, 1979	0404
Chrissy gets a new job selling cosmetics door-to-door and unexpectedly finds herself in the middle of Mr. Furley's winner-take-all strip poker game.
58	5	"Jack the Ripper"	Dave Powers	Bill Richmond & Gene Perret	October 9, 1979	0406
Jack had been feeling walked on by Furley, Dean Travers, and the girls lately; so he visits a psychologist (Joel Brooks), who teaches him how to be assertive. It works too well, and Jack becomes aggressive and unbearable, causing an ongoing dispute with Mr. Furley over repair issues to turn into an angry shouting match. Jack and Mr. Furley realize they have been visiting the same psychologist, and Jack chooses to go back to his old ways--but not to let people push him around.
59	6	"The Lifesaver"	Dave Powers	George Burditt	October 23, 1979	0407
While working in a restaurant, Jack saves a man's life with the Heimlich maneuver. It is revealed that this man (Phil Leeds) is actually a freeloader when he offers the trio a rent-free luxury apartment in exchange for a gourmet dinner, but he is only looking for a handout. Meanwhile, the trio had been having problems with Mr. Furley complaining about excessive noise in their apartment, which leads to an eviction threat. But falling for the freeloader's luxury apartment scam, the trio taunts Mr. Furley with excessive noise-making and tells him they are happy to leave. Meanwhile, Mr. Furley has told off his brother because the same freeloader offered Mr. Furley a supposed manager's job in the same (non-existent) luxury apartment building. When the trio and Mr. Furley realize they've been had, Jack helps smooth things over between Mr. Furley and his brother; and in return, the trio is not evicted after all.
60	7	"Old Folks at Home"	Dave Powers	Michael S. Baser & Kim Weiskopf	October 30, 1979	0409
Chrissy takes in an elderly man named Leo who has come looking for an apartment after he has recently become homeless. He inadvertently makes a nuisance of himself when Jack brings home a date; but out of respect and sympathy for Leo, Jack kicks her to the curb when she insults Leo. When Leo disappears the next day, the trio becomes worried, but Leo returns to tell them he has moved in with some "buddies"--a pair of elderly women. Guest Stars: J. Pat O'Malley as Leo Moran, Simone Griffeth as Nancy Norwood, Jeanne Bates as Alice and Josephine Livingston as Lili.
61	8	"A-Camping We Will Go"	Dave Powers	Michael S. Baser & Kim Weiskopf	November 6, 1979	0405
An overtired Jack reluctantly agrees to accompany Larry and his date, an actress named Laura (Louise Williams) at Larry's boss' secluded mountain lodge; but Jack's yearning for sleep turns into a disaster when Chrissy, Janet, and the rest of the gang show up and starts a hilarious scramble for one bed.
62	9	"Chrissy's Hospitality"	Dave Powers	Mark Tuttle	November 13, 1979	0408
While installing a new shower curtain, Chrissy falls in the bathtub, causing a bump to develop on her head. Later, she suffers dizzy spells as a result, so Jack and Janet rush her to the hospital. When Jack and Janet visit Chrissy the next morning, they find the doctor leaving her room in tears and saying that "she could go at any time." Assuming the worst, Jack and Janet are uncertain how to break the news to Chrissy. Actually, the doctor (Keene Curtis) teared up from laughter at Chrissy's jokes and that Chrissy is due to be discharged later that day in perfect health.
63	10	"The Loan Shark"	Dave Powers	Mark Tuttle	November 20, 1979	0410
Chrissy loses a check Jack planned to use to pay his tuition. However, Chrissy manages to get the money for Jack, who is horrified to discover she got it from a loan shark. To get out of potential trouble, Jack returns the money to the shark, but is short of the interest needed to officially clear himself. However, after learning that Jack is a student chef, the shark makes a deal with Jack in which he will forgive the interest on the loan in exchange for Jack giving his wife gourmet cooking lessons. However; the shark's young, beautiful Italian wife--who doesn't speak fluent English--is more interested in seducing Jack than learning cuisine. When her husband catches her kissing Jack, she gets Jack out of trouble by explaining that she is congratulating Jack for the baby he and his "wife" Chrissy are "expecting." By the episode's end, Jack receives a duplicate replacement check in the mail he apparently requested to defray his tuition. Guest Stars: Harold J. Stone as Bernie Bustamente, Livia Ginise as Lucia Bustamente and Mickey Morton as Floyd.
64	11	"The Love Barge"	Dave Powers	Bill Richmond & Gene Perret	November 27, 1979	0411
Jack gets an opportunity to work as a chef on a cruise ship and the girls jeopardize their friendship over who Jack can take as his one guest. Lana tries to invite herself, under the pretense that Janet and Chrissy shouldn't end their friendship over a cruise. Jack doesn't relish being pursued by Lana, so he passes off the opportunity to a thrilled Mr. Furley. However, the trio receives news that Lana is less than thrilled and Mr. Furley spends the week-long voyage seasick. Guest Star: Bob Hastings as John Callan.
65	12	"Ralph's Rival"	Dave Powers	George Atkins	December 4, 1979	0412
Merl Denker (Roger C. Carmel), an old rival and nemesis of Mr. Furley, has come to town and Mr. Furley wants to appear to him as a successful professional, because Mr. Denker has always been more successful. Mr. Furley talks Chrissy into posing as his trophy wife during Mr. Denker's visit. Later, Larry comes to see Mr. Furley about a repair when he overhears Mr. Furley and Chrissy talking about her staying overnight with Mr. Furley; and in turn, Larry tells Jack and Janet that Chrissy and Mr. Furley are sleeping together. The situation gets more out of control when Chrissy's musclebound date Elmo (Reb Brown), who came to the apartment looking for her, overhears this as well and angrily goes to Mr. Furley's apartment to confront him. In the end; Mr. Furley is forced to admit the ruse, and Mr. Furley is surprised when Mr. Denker spills the beans about himself as well, confessing that he, too, is a perpetual failure.
66	13	"A Black Letter Day"	Dave Powers	Story by : Mark Chambers; Teleplay by : Michael S. Baser & Kim Weiskopf	December 11, 1979	0413
Lana reads a letter in a Dear Abby column that mentions a man living with two girls and who is having an affair with one of them. She mentions this to Chrissy and Janet, which leads each to think the other is having an affair with Jack, which causes friction between them. When Jack finds out, he decides to teach the girls a lesson by faking a suicide attempt, but the girls eventually figure out that the letter was not about them. This episode marks the final appearance of Ann Wedgeworth as Lana Shields. The character mysteriously disappeared and was never heard from or referred to again.
67	14	"The Reverend Steps Out"	Dave Powers	Michael S. Baser & Kim Weiskopf	December 18, 1979	0414
Reverend Snow (Chrissy's father, Peter Mark Richman) has been given the opportunity to take over a church in Santa Monica. Chrissy is unaware of this when she sees him with another woman in an ice cream parlor and jumps to the conclusion that her father is having an affair. The woman, Mrs. Claremont (Patricia Barry), is among the members of the selection committee who will decide whether to accept Reverend Snow into the church, but she does not approve of Chrissy's living arrangements. Because of this, Reverend Snow is passed on by Mrs. Claremont, but not before he straightens out the situation for Chrissy. Although no longer a cast member, Ann Wedgeworth still appears in the opening credits of this episode.
68	15	"Larry Loves Janet"	Dave Powers	John Boni	January 8, 1980	0415
Larry returns home after a big date goes bad and Janet decides to cheer him up. Larry is so won over by Janet's "nice girl" attitude that he falls hard for her. Janet tries to dissuade him by playing herself as the vamp that Larry normally goes for, but this only bolsters his feelings. Jack and Chrissy come to her rescue by congratulating Larry for his new future filled with marriage and children, which frightens Larry back to his senses.
69	16	"Mighty Mouth"	Dave Powers	Howard Gewirtz & Ian Praiser	January 15, 1980	0416
Chrissy and Janet's efforts to get Jack into prime physical condition succeed beyond their wildest expectations when their voluptuous gym instructor Shirley (Tori Lysdahl) falls for him--much to the anger of her unnecessarily overprotective, musclebound, gym owner brother (Steve Sandor). Tori Lysdahl, who played Shirley in the episode, later appears in the Season 7 episode "Diamond Jack" as a jewel thief.
70	17	"The Love Lesson"	Dave Powers	Mark Tuttle	January 22, 1980	0417
Mr. Furley attempts to convert Jack from his supposed homosexuality to heterosexuality, and Jack may have to face eviction from the apartment as a result. Guest-starring: Joanna Kerns and Jim Sullivan
71	18	"Handcuffed"	Dave Powers	Story by : Len Richmond; Teleplay by : Michael S. Baser & Kim Weiskopf	January 29, 1980	0418
Chrissy's cousin Jay, a police officer, visits the apartment on a noise complaint and forgets his handcuffs when he leaves. After Chrissy and Jack jokingly play around with the handcuffs by cuffing themselves together, they realize that there is no key to unlock them and they end up trapped together; and Jack is stuck with Chrissy connected to him while on a date with another woman at the Regal Beagle. Another cop named Mike spots Jack and Chrissy together and Jim the bartender gives them a heads-up. They then go to Mr. Furley's to try to get the cuffs off, but Mike catches up to them. Jay returns with the key, but Mike tells him that he's finished. Chrissy comes to Jay's rescue when she manages to get Mike's badge due to his own carelessness. Guest Stars: Daniel Trent as Jay Garfield, Heather Lowe as Brenda, Alan Manson as Mike the Cop, Cameron Young as Man in Bar, Paul Ainsley as Jim the Bartender as Isabelle Wolfe as Waitress.
72	19	"And Baby Makes Two"	Dave Powers	Ellen Guylas	February 5, 1980	0419
The trio talks about a friend of Janet's who had a child by advertising in the newspaper for a partner. When Janet backs out of a planned ski trip and men start responding to an ad she placed in the paper; Jack and Chrissy think she is doing the same thing. Janet is actually planning to redecorate hers and Chrissy's bedroom to surprise Chrissy and had been placing an ad in the paper to recruit an art student to help her. Guest Stars: Philip Charles MacKenzie as Roger, Robert E. Quigley as Guy #1 and Mark Siegel as Guy #2.
73	20	"Jack's Bad Boy"	Dave Powers	Mark Tuttle	February 12, 1980	0420
A trouble-making 12-year-old boy named Billy, claiming to be homeless, wins the girls' sympathy and moves into the apartment, causing problems for Jack after he escapes from his foster home due to his foster parents making him do chores before going outside to play. Guest Stars: Shane Sinutko as Billy Todson and Joe George as Chauffeur. This episode appears to be a reworking of "The Crush" from Season 3.
74	21	"Lee Ain't Heavy, He's My Brother"	Dave Powers	Michael S. Baser & Kim Weiskopf	February 26, 1980	0421
Jack's older brother Lee visits and Jack is depressed, as he has always been in Lee's shadow. He becomes even more upset when Lee takes Chrissy to a dinner in his honor and they share a deep, passionate kiss at the doorstep. Mr. Furley tries to cheer Jack up, but gets depressed when he starts thinking about his own more successful brother Bart. Lee takes Jack and Chrissy to dinner, where Jack proceeds to make a fool of himself. Even so, Chrissy tells Jack she would rather be with him than Lee, who is too self-involved for her tastes. Guesr Stars: John Getz as Lee Tripper and Albert Carrier as Maurice.
75	22	"The Root of All Evil"	Dave Powers	Howard Albrecht & Sol Weinstein	March 4, 1980	0422
Chrissy gives Jack and Larry some money to place a bet for her when they go to the racetrack. Her crazy choices pay off, earning her a windfall of $1,637.00 and she decides to split it with Jack and Janet and puts the money into a joint savings account. However, a big fight ensues when Janet buys a $75.00 bottle of wine and Chrissy buys a $200.00 stuffed giraffe. The trio then meets with a psychologist (Joel Brooks in his recurring role from "Jack the Ripper") to try to refrain from their splurging habits.
76	23	"Secret Admirer"	Dave Powers	Story by : Joyce Gittlin & Steve Clements; Teleplay by : Mark Tuttle	March 11, 1980	0423
Chrissy had been receiving notes from a secret admirer and tries to meet with him at the Regal Beagle, but he never shows up. He leaves Chrissy another note saying he will come to the apartment; and when he arrives, he turns out to be Gilbert Larwin, a shy, nebbish newspaper salesman who works in the office building where Chrissy works. Believing Gilbert is not Chrissy's type, Janet and Jack try to get rid of him by having Larry pose as a jealous date of Chrissy's, which doesn't work. Later; after they discover that Gilbert stayed overnight as a result of a nice, lengthy conversation with Chrissy, Jack and Janet decides to confront Gilbert and misinterprets him, thinking he wants to marry Chrissy. So Jack and Janet tell Chrissy that Gilbert is thinking about marrying her, which Chrissy isn't ready for. So in an attempt to scare Gilbert out of supposedly wanting marriage, they have Chrissy pose as an overbearing, cranky morning person. However, Gilbert tells Chrissy that he just wants to be friends and Chrissy tells him they already are friends. Guest Stars: Barry Gordon as Gilbert Larwin, Paul Ainsley as Jim the Bartender, Stephen Johnson as Phil Durkin, David Himes as Brad, and Indy Shriner as Barbara.
77	24	"The Goodbye Guy"	Dave Powers	Howard Albrecht & Sol Weinstein	March 25, 1980	0424
The trio become convinced that Mr. Furley plans to kill himself after finding him depressed after not being able to have Nancy (Gloria LeRoy) take an interest in him. In order prevent him from doing himself in, the gang decides to shower Mr. Furley with praise and friendship. However, Mr. Furley begins to take advantage of their concern for his well-being.
78	25	"Jack's Graduation"	Dave Powers	Michael S. Baser & Kim Weiskopf	May 6, 1980	0425
Jack's graduation from cooking school is jeopardized when a scheming classmate (Steve Vinovich) steals the dish Jack made for his final exam. The gang puts together a plan to trap the thief in his lie with the unwitting help of Dean Travers (William Pierson).

=== Season 5 (1980–81) ===
No. overall	No. in season	Title	Directed by	Written by	Original release date	Prod. code
79	1	"Upstairs, Downstairs, Downstairs"	Dave Powers	Joseph Staretski & Martin Rips	October 28, 1980	0503
Jack promised to make a gourmet dinner for Janet and Chrissy, even canceling a date with his current girlfriend Doreen (Lee Crawford) in order to do so. Larry then shanghais Jack into covering for him on a blind date for that same evening, but Doreen never receives the cancellation message. Jack now finds himself in a three-way conflict when he is left having to prepare three gourmet dinners in three different apartments on the same night.
80	2	"...And Justice for Jack"	Dave Powers	George Burditt	November 11, 1980	0501
Jack's first day behind the grill at a diner heats up hilariously when his attractive boss (Ellen Travolta) tries to spice up her life by making an unwelcome play on him. After Jack confronts her about this, she fires him. Janet then encourages Jack to sue his love-starved boss for sexual harassment. Suzanne Somers did not show up for taping in protest while asking for a pay raise. In the episode, it is explained that Chrissy went to visit her parents for a few days.
81	3	"A Hundred Dollars a What?"	Dave Powers	George Burditt	November 18, 1980	0504
Darlene (Elaine Giftos), a high school friend of Chrissy's, is in town for a visit. When Jack meets her, he invites her to his family's home in San Diego with him for his mother's birthday. However, Jack discovers Darlene is a high-priced call girl, who has invited an unwitting Chrissy to work with her as a "hostess" at a convention. This episode marks Suzanne Somers' final "full" appearance in an episode. Her remaining seven appearances would be cameos, most of which would be in the episode's closing tag. In the cameos, Chrissy would call from her parents' home in Fresno to speak with Jack or Janet, who would sometimes fill Chrissy in on what happened in the episode.
82	4	"Downhill Chaser"	Dave Powers	Joseph Staretski & Martin Rips	November 25, 1980	0505
Jack tries to back out of a ski trip with Larry and Janet until he meets a cute snow bunny named Inga (Laurette Spang). He impresses her with tales of his (non-existent) skiing prowess. All seems well until Inga challenges Jack to ski the "Flying Dutchman" run (a very challenging, and therefore dangerous, hill) at her parents' ski lodge. Suzanne Somers did not show up for taping in protest while asking for a pay raise. In the episode it is stated that Chrissy is away. Don Knotts took over most of her lines.
83	5	"A Crowded Romance"	Dave Powers	Mark Tuttle	December 2, 1980	0502
Jack and Larry congratulate each other on their fantastic new girlfriends, nicknamed "Twinkie" and "Bunny," respectively. However, Janet discovers through a flower shop delivery that "Twinkie" and "Bunny" are the same girl (Rebecca Holden). A chance discovery of Larry and "Twinkie" together in front of a department store window (where Jack is currently employed as a mechanical mannequin) creates a brief love triangle between the three until it is revealed that "Twinkie/Bunny" has three other boyfriends on the side. Suzanne Somers did not show up for taping in protest while asking for a pay raise. In the episode, it is explained that Chrissy went to visit her parents for a few days.
84	6	"Room at the Bottom"	Dave Powers	Joseph Staretski & Martin Rips	December 9, 1980	0506
Jack resigns his job at a hamburger joint and applies for a position as a chef at Lucien's, an exclusive French restaurant. Unfortunately; Jack's skills, along with Dean Travers' recommendation, only succeeds in landing him a job as a busboy. Ashamed, Jack can't bring himself to tell his friends the truth; especially when they all show up at the restaurant one night, expecting to find Jack in his supposed job as chef. Suzanne Somers, in her role of Chrissy, makes the first of her seven cameo appearances in which Chrissy calls the roommates from Fresno by telephone. While the rest of Chrissy's phone scenes appear in the episode's tag throughout the season, this scene occurs in the middle of the episode.
85	7	"Chrissy's Cousin"	Dave Powers	Budd Grossman and George Burditt	December 16, 1980	0507
Chrissy's trip to Fresno has left the trio short on the rent for the month. Jack, Janet, Larry, and Mr. Furley all maneuver to fill the "third roommate" spot with their respective choices. However, Chrissy's eager cousin Cindy Snow (Jenilee Harrison), using a somewhat clever process of elimination of the other would-be roomies, moves in after a rather clumsy introduction. First appearance of Jenilee Harrison as Chrissy's cousin Cindy Snow, who is cast as Suzanne Somers' first of two blonde replacements in the trio on the show.
86	8	"Jack to the Rescue"	Dave Powers	George Burditt	January 6, 1981	0508
Janet learns that Cindy's boss Mr. Hadley (Rod Colbin) is asking for favors above and beyond the call of duty. Enter Jack, who decides to take matters into his own hands by showing up at Cindy's office to confront Hadley, which ultimately gets Cindy fired. However, Jack realizes the cruel deed he's done and returns to the office to apologize, but has second thoughts when Jack sneaks into Hadley's office and catches him making a play on one of his other secretaries. Realizing he got caught, Hadley shows up at the apartment, apologizes to Cindy, and begs her to take her job back with the promise of a raise and no more outside duties. But Cindy refuses, convinced she can get a better job with a more respectable boss. Suzanne Somers, in her role of Chrissy, makes a cameo appearance in the episode's tag.
87	9	"The Not-So-Great Imposter"	Dave Powers	George Burditt Budd Grossman Mark Tuttle Martin Rips Joseph Staretski Michael S. Baser & Kim Weiskopf	January 13, 1981	0509
Jack inadvertently assumes the identity of David Miller, a renowned chef whose culinary reputation gets Jack hired by Mr. Angelino (Jordan Charney). However, Miller's other reputation as a gambler and philanderer catches up to Jack on his first night on the job. This episode marks the second appearance of actor Jordan Charney, this time as the recurring role of restaurant owner Mr. Angelino, Jack's boss. (Charney first appeared in the series as Larry's boss in the episode "Jack Moves Out.") From this point on, Charney remained in the series in his recurring role of Mr. Angelino for the remainder of the series' run.
88	10	"Jack's Other Mother"	Dave Powers	Mark Tuttle	January 20, 1981	0510
Jack befriends an elderly woman, Gladys Moore (Amzie Strickland), who comes to regard Jack as a surrogate "son." Gladys' doting nature soon proves rather troublesome when she begins to meddle in Jack's love life. Suzanne Somers, in her role of Chrissy, makes a cameo appearance in the episode's tag.
89	11	"Make Room for Daddy"	Dave Powers	Joseph Staretski & Martin Rips	January 27, 1981	0511
Jack plays cupid to his current girlfriend's widowed father (Keene Curtis), but his arrows misfire when the love-starved older man makes Janet his target. Suzanne Somers, in her role of Chrissy, makes a cameo appearance in the episode's tag. This is the only phone tag in which Chrissy speaks to Jack on the telephone. In all the other phone tags, Chrissy speaks with Janet. Also, this was the second appearance of actor Keene Curtis in the series, whose first role was as Chrissy's attending physician in "Chrissy's Hospitality."
90	12	"Janet's Secret"	Dave Powers	Michael S. Baser & Kim Weiskopf	February 3, 1981	0512
Janet's overprotective parents (Macon McCalman and Paula Shaw) come for a visit after she tells them that Jack is her husband, indicating that her parents disapprove of the trio's living arrangements. This comes as a surprise to Jack, who has a date (Sondra Currie) for the same night Janet's parents arrive.
91	13	"Father of the Bride"	Dave Powers	Tom Dunsmuir	February 10, 1981	0513
A wealthy man, Winston Cromwell III (Jeffrey Tambor), persistently tries to convince Cindy to marry him, despite her repeated refusals. Cromwell then attempts to win over Jack and Janet by giving them lavish gifts. Despite his very tempting offers, they decide to help Cindy rid herself of Cromwell once and for all. Suzanne Somers, in her role of Chrissy, makes a cameo appearance in the episode's tag. Also, actor Jeffrey Tambor, who had a major role in the Three's Company spinoff The Ropers as the Ropers' snobbish neighbor, makes his first of three recurring appearances (as different characters) on Three's Company.
92	14	"Furley vs. Furley"	Dave Powers	Michael S. Baser & Kim Weiskopf	February 17, 1981	0514
Jack goes over Mr. Furley and complains directly to the building's owner, Mr. Furley's brother Bart (Hamilton Camp), about Mr. Furley's failure to make repairs. Bart responds by firing Mr. Furley. Jack then goes to meet Bart to explain the situation and inadvertently lands the job of manager himself. Now out of a job, Mr. Furley moves in with the trio, who conspires to convince Bart that Jack is wrong for the job and to rehire Mr. Furley.
93	15	"In Like Larry"	Dave Powers	Joseph Staretski & Martin Rips	February 24, 1981	0515
After a fight with Janet and Cindy, Jack stays in Larry's apartment while Larry moves downstairs to live with the girls. Jack soon misses his roommates, while Larry unsuccessfully tries to develop an intimate relationship with the girls. Suzanne Somers, in her role of Chrissy, makes a cameo appearance in the episode's tag.
94	16	"Teacher's Pet"	Dave Powers	Mark Tuttle	March 3, 1981	0516
While teaching at his old cooking school, Jack finds himself in a predicament when Dean Travers' (William Pierson) niece, Betty Jean (Dorian Lopinto), tries to seduce him in order to get an "A" in the class.
95	17	"And Baby Makes Four"	Dave Powers	Joseph Staretski & Martin Rips	March 10, 1981	0517
Cindy breaks up with her boyfriend, a fashion photographer named Doug (John McCook), after he chronically criticizes her supposedly unfit facial features for modeling. Later at the apartment, Cindy talks with a friend on the phone about borrowing some maternity clothing for the waitress at the Regal Beagle, who is pregnant. Overhearing this telephone conversation, coupled with the grudge Cindy is holding on Doug for betraying her, Jack and Janet mistakenly believe Doug had gotten Cindy pregnant and abandoned her. After an unsuccessful confrontation with Doug over this matter, Jack decides to make an honest woman of Cindy and proposes to her--before the whole situation is cleared up. Suzanne Somers makes her seventh and final appearance as Chrissy Snow in the episode's tag.
96	18	"Night of the Ropers"	Dave Powers	George Burditt and Budd Grossman	March 17, 1981	0518
A surprise visit by the bickering Ropers turns into a romantic triangle when the lusty Mrs. Roper seeks solace from Jack and Janet and winds up in the arms of Mr. Furley. Special guest stars: Norman Fell and Audra Lindley as Mr. and Mrs. Roper, respectively.
97	19	"Double Trouble"	Dave Powers	Story by : Mark Fink, Joseph Staretski & Martin Rips; Teleplay by : Joseph Staretski & Martin Rips	March 24, 1981	0519
To avoid eviction from the apartment because of his true sexuality, Jack poses as his fake twin brother Austin, a cowboy from Texas, so that he may romance Mr. Furley's attractive visiting niece (Robin Eisenman).
98	20	"Dying to Meet You"	Dave Powers	Budd Grossman and George Burdit	May 5, 1981	0522
Jack gets a preview of the Other Side when Larry hatches a plan to save him from his current girlfriend's (Pamela Brull) murderously jealous other boyfriend (Terry Kiser).
99	21	"The Case of the Missing Blonde"	Dave Powers	Michael S. Baser & Kim Weiskopf	May 12, 1981	0520
Upon returning home from a horror movie, Jack and Janet panic when they discover that Cindy disappeared, supposedly without a trace; and they believe Cindy was abducted when they were informed that Cindy was seen getting into an unknown man's car, in tears. Jack and Janet become even more paranoid when Larry and Mr. Furley fail to return home when they help search for Cindy. What everyone doesn't know is that the unknown man turned out to be Cindy's knife salesman father (Alan Manson), who paid her a surprise visit. It turned out that Jack and Janet overlooked the note that Cindy left by the phone.
100	22	"Honest Jack Tripper"	Dave Powers	Mark Tuttle	May 19, 1981	0521
After yet another date (Anne Schedeen) fails because of his lying, Jack vows to always tell the truth from that point on. But his new policy of total honesty leads to trouble for another date (Shell Kepler), roommates and neighbors alike.

=== Season 6 (1981–82) ===
No. overall	No. in season	Title	Directed by	Written by	Original release date	Prod. code
101	1	"Jack Bares All"	Dave Powers	Joseph Staretski & Martin Rips	October 6, 1981	0601
102	2	"Jack Bares All"	Dave Powers	Joseph Staretski & Martin Rips	October 6, 1981	0602
As Cindy packs up for UCLA and Janet looks for a new roommate, Jack is preparing for Cindy's farewell party when he is called in to Angelino's restaurant for a spur-of-the-moment cooking job. After cutting his finger, Jack goes to the hospital and is attended to by nurse Terri Alden (Priscilla Barnes), who bruises Jack's ego with a tetanus shot in the buttocks. After an angry and embarrassed Jack leaves; Janet meets Terri and, after she finds out Terri is looking for an apartment, Janet gives her the offer to move in, which she accepts. When Terri reveals this to Jack by surprising him with her appearance in the apartment later that day, he is appalled. Later, when Jack is preparing food for Cindy's party, Terri tries to get on his good side by flrting with him, then apologizing when she is told by Mr. Furley that he is gay, but only makes things worse. To retaliate, and wanting Terri out desperately, Jack and Larry devise a plan to humiliate her during Cindy's party. After nearly driving Terri to tears with hurtful pranks; Jack realizes he has made a horrible mistake, apologizes, and tells her she can move in. First appearance of Priscilla Barnes as Terri Alden, the final blonde replacement in the trio.
103	3	"Terri Makes Her Move"	Dave Powers	Ellen Guylas	October 13, 1981	0603
To boost Jack's confidence, Terri turns on the charm, causing Janet to suspect that her new roommate's interest in Jack is more than platonic.Guest starring: Hugh Gillin as Mr. Alden, Mina Kolb as Mrs. Alden, and Jennifer Walker as Samantha Alden
104	4	"Professor Jack"	Dave Powers	Laura Levine	October 27, 1981	0604
Terri thinks an attractive older woman's visits to Jack are weekly lessons in lovemaking and, in disgust, decides to move out.
105	5	"Some of That Jazz"	Dave Powers	George Burditt	November 3, 1981	0608
Terri and Jack believe that Janet will have to make it with her dance instructor (Michael Bell) if she wants to make it as a dancer. In the end, their inclinations turn out to be true and Jack consoles a devastated Janet.
106	6	"Lies My Roommate Told Me"	Dave Powers	George Burditt	November 10, 1981	0607
Jack breaks a date with Janet to coach a nervous Larry, who's hoping to romance Terri with smooth conversation. Guest starring: Teresa Ganzel as "Greedy" Gretchen.
107	7	"Two Flew Over the Cuckoo's Nest"	Dave Powers	Shelley Zellman	November 17, 1981	0606
Jack and Janet mistake Terri's psychiatrist friend (Jeffrey Tambor) for a mentally challenged patient from a hospital psychiatric ward.
108	8	"Eyewitness Blues"	Dave Powers	Michael S. Baser & Kim Weiskopf	November 24, 1981	0605
A plainclothes cop (Donald Petrie) moves in to protect Jack, whose life is in danger after witnessing an armed robbery at the flower shop.
109	9	"Boy Meets Dummy"	Dave Powers	John Boni	December 1, 1981	0610
Jack must come up with a "wife" (a CPR dummy Terri had been using to give CPR classes to neighbors) in an attempt to thwart the advances of his boss' man-hungry daughter.
110	10	"Dates of Wrath"	Dave Powers	John Boni	December 8, 1981	0609
Janet fumes when she inadvertently fixes up Terri with a guy she wanted to date herself.
111	11	"Macho Man"	Dave Powers	John Boni	December 15, 1981	0611
After seeing Terri thwart a masher at the Regal Beagle with her karate skills, Jack asks Terri to teach him karate; but ends up arrested when he uses his karate on a police officer (Kenneth White) whom he mistakes for a burglar.
112	12	"Strangers In the Night"	Dave Powers	Shelley Zellman	January 5, 1982	0612
Jack concocts a plan to regain the favor of an attractive Southern belle (Gwen Humble) he insulted on a date.
113	13	"The Matchbreakers"	Dave Powers	Bryan Joseph	January 12, 1982	0613
The trio is worried that the woman with whom Mr. Furley has fallen in love (Ruta Lee) is a golddigger out to take Mr. Furley for all he's worth. Her only interest in Mr. Furley is the intention of buying the building she believes he owns so she can subdivide it into condominiums.
114	14	"Oh, Nun"	Dave Powers	Calvin Kelly	January 19, 1982	0614
Terri's friend (Susan Plumb), a nun, visits; and Jack volunteers to show her around town since Terri is unable to do so. Later, Jack inadvertently overhears Terri's friend reads some notes to Terri about another nun who wishes to marry an ordinary guy so she can use them in a thesis she is writing. Misinterpreting this; Jack panics, thinking Terri's friend wants to give up her life as a nun to marry him. So with help from Larry, Jack poses as an alcoholic, hoping it would make Terri's friend have second thoughts about him.
115	15	"Maid to Order"	Dave Powers	Laura Levine	January 26, 1982	0615
The trio reluctantly takes on former roommate Cindy as their cleaning lady.
116	16	"Hearts and Flowers"	Dave Powers	Ellen Guylas	February 2, 1982	0617
A fault-finding efficiency expert (Laurie Lea Schaefer) drives Janet to resign her job at the flower shop.
117	17	"Urban Plowboy"	Dave Powers	Joseph Staretski & Martin Rips	February 9, 1982	0618
Larry incurs the wrath of a towering, hot-tempered man by dating the man's girlfriend and crashing his car for good measure. To make matters worse, the livid boyfriend seeks revenge against "Jack Tripper", not realizing that the man he's searching for is actually Larry, who has been using Jack's name as an alias. So to avoid the angry, vengeful boyfriend, Jack joins Cindy and the rest of the gang for a weekend on a farm owned by Cindy's Aunt Becky (Sue Ane Langdon). The jealous boyfriend tracks down Jack at the farm (thanks to Mr. Furley's blabbering), and chaos ensues as Jack tries unsuccessfully to hide out in the barn and subsequently poses with Janet as a married farm couple to avoid the man's rampage.
118	18	"A Friend in Need"	Dave Powers	James Ritz	February 16, 1982	0616
Jack subs for the chef at Angelino's restaurant (Gino Conforti) where a mobster is so impressed with the bill of fare that he insists that Jack be made permanent chef.
119	19	"Jack's 10"	Dave Powers	Ken Hecht & Bob Brunner	February 23, 1982	0620
Jack adopts a new image and changes his career plans to please an affluent woman (Karen Austin) who would like to marry him.
120	20	"Doctor in the House"	Dave Powers	John Boni	March 2, 1982	0621
Jack poses as a doctor to impress his visiting grandfather (Edward Andrews), who is eager to observe Jack's hospital practice.
121	21	"Critic's Choice"	Dave Powers	Shelley Zellman	March 9, 1982	0619
Jack challenges a famous food critic to sample his cuisine, aiming for a favorable review in his newspaper column.
122	22	"Paradise Lost"	Dave Powers	Shelley Zellman	March 16, 1982	0622
Terri presents Jack and Janet with the opportunity to rent a huge house, at the same rate they're paying for the apartment, from a doctor who is leaving the country for two years. Larry and Mr. Furley, not wanting to lose their best (and only) friends, plot to make them want to stay.
123	23	"And Now Here's Jack"	Dave Powers	Story by : Hank Bradford, Joseph Staretski & Martin Rips; Teleplay by : Joseph Staretski & Martin Rips	March 23, 1982	0624
Jack is invited on a local TV talk show to do a cooking demonstration, and recruits Janet and Terri to assist him. After the director changes the setup of the kitchen set (thereby displacing Jack's discreetly-placed note cards), the demonstration turns into a chaotic comedy of errors on live TV.
124	24	"Janet Wigs Out"	Dave Powers	Budd Grossman	April 6, 1982	0626
Janet buys a blonde wig to wear in an attempt to boost her confidence. However, the wig causes Janet to develop an ego trip that alienates her friendships, as well as spoiling an opportunity to develop a relationship with a nice new neighbor who moved into the building. This was Jenilee Harrison's final appearance as Cindy Snow.
125	25	"Up in the Air"	Dave Powers	Shelley Zellman	May 4, 1982	0623
Janet falls for a rich young man (special guest star Barry Williams) who invites her (and a date) to a stuffy, formal party on a small island. Jack agrees to be Janet's date; but after taking an invigorating drink called "The Rocket" (not long after taking a double-dose of a tranquilizer, against Terri's warnings, to calm his fear of flying), he becomes the life of the party, embarrassing Janet and causing a chaotic disaster. Elements of this episode are based on the episode "I Won't Dance, Don't Ask Me..." from Man About the House.
126	26	"Mate for Each Other"	Dave Powers	Ellen Guylas	May 11, 1982	0625
Jack and Janet visit with friends, a couple who were matched by a computer dating service. Initially dismissive of the idea, Jack decides to try the service secretly. When Jack arrives at the designated meeting place, he is shocked to discover he has been matched with an equally-secretive Janet.
127	27	"The Best of Three's Company"	Dave Powers	Don Nicholl, Michael Ross and Bernie West	May 18, 1982	0627
128	28	"The Best of Three's Company"	Dave Powers	Don Nicholl, Michael Ross and Bernie West	May 18, 1982	0628
Legendary sitcom actress Lucille Ball hosts a one-hour retrospective looking back at the previous six seasons of the series. Part one includes Jack's arrival in the apartment and how the roommates have adapted to one another. Part two highlights John Ritter's physical comedy and how the show's comedy relies on the classic sitcom misunderstanding. Ritter also makes a brief appearance with Ball. This episode was presented in primetime as a one-hour special, but shown in two parts in syndication.

=== Season 7 (1982–83) ===
No. overall	No. in season	Title	Directed by	Written by	Original release date	Prod. code
129	1	"A Night Not to Remember"	Dave Powers	Budd Grossman	September 28, 1982	0705
Janet's dinner date with an important but lecherous man from the home office turns into a disaster when her ailing "chaperone" Jack gets drunk and falls asleep in her bed.
130	2	"Jack Goes to the Dentist"	Dave Powers	Budd Grossman	October 12, 1982	0701
When Terri breaks up with her ill-tempered dentist boyfriend (Jeffrey Tambor), he believes that his patient, Jack, is the cause.
131	3	"Diamond Jack"	Dave Powers	Ellen Guylas	October 19, 1982	0702
Larry arranges a blind date for Jack--with a jewel thief (Tori Lysdahl) who mistakes him for a fence. Tori Lysdahl, who played the trio's voluptuous gym instructor Shirley in the Season 4 episode "Mighty Mouth," appears in this episode as the jewel thief. Coincidentally, Lysdahl played a similar role in the episode "Mrs. Rosco P. Coltrane" from The Dukes of Hazzard.
132	4	"Extra, Extra"	Dave Powers	Ellen Guylas	October 26, 1982	0704
Janet's date, a newspaper writer (Mark W. Travis), offers to do a column on the trio's methods of coping with inflation. The published article, however, insinuates that their living arrangement is more intimate than platonic.
133	5	"Jack Gets His"	Dave Powers	Joseph Staretski & Martin Rips	November 9, 1982	0703
Jack is conned into renting a small restaurant, only to discover that it has fallen into a state of disrepair. At the persuading of the rest of the gang, Jack decides to fix up the restaurant and name it "Jack's Bistro."
134	6	"Opening Night"	Dave Powers	Shelley Zellman	November 16, 1982	0706
Larry, who put the wrong date on the flyers announcing the opening of Jack's Bistro, manages to "save" the day by inviting his Greek relatives.
135	7	"Cousin, Cuisine"	Dave Powers	Joseph Staretski & Martin Rips	November 23, 1982	0707
Jack's attempted romance with Maria (Maria Richwine), Felipe's beautiful cousin, is plagued by many problems.
136	8	"An Affair to Forget"	Dave Powers	Michael Weinberger	November 30, 1982	0709
Janet is happy that her old friend Randy (Elaine Giftos), a TV commercial director, is dating Jack; until she discovers that Randy is married.
137	9	"The Brunch"	Dave Powers	Story by : Budd Grossman and George Burditt; Teleplay by : George Burditt	December 7, 1982	0708
Jack hosts a Sunday brunch to convince Rev. Gilmore (Earl Boen) and members of his congregation that the Bistro is a respectable establishment. He succeeds until the newlywed couple at a neighboring table begin their honeymoon - literally.
138	10	"The Impossible Dream"	Dave Powers	Shelley Zellman	December 14, 1982	0710
Jack is grateful for Larry's suggestion of a friend, a guitarist who is a co-worker of Larry's, to play the Bistro for free as a business boost. But Larry, who is a terrible singer, decides to sit in as a singer and the patrons seem to enjoy his performance, impressing Jack enough to want to hire him to sing nightly. What Jack didn't know is that on opening night Larry paid off his audience to applaud his performance; and his performance the following night turns into a disaster, prompting Jack to fire his best friend.
139	11	"Breaking Up Is Hard to Do"	Dave Powers	Ellen Guylas	January 4, 1983	0711
Mr. Furley discovers that the nice young man Janet and Jack fixed Terri up with is a convicted murderer.
140	12	"Larry's Sister"	Dave Powers	Paul Wayne	January 11, 1983	0714
Larry completely trusts Jack to show his teenage sister around town, until he discovers that they are still out at 2:00am.
141	13	"Bob and Carol & Larry and Terri"	Dave Powers	Joseph Staretski & Martin Rips	January 18, 1983	0713
By the time an innocent story is retold through several people, the trio believes Bob and Carol's marriage is on the rocks. Larry and Terri try to straighten things out with the couple, only to be "caught" by Mr. Furley.
142	14	"Going to Pot"	Dave Powers	Shelley Zellman	February 1, 1983	0712
When the Bistro's building inspector (William Cort) demands a bribe from Jack, Janet suggests he secretly tapes their next conversation for evidence. However, a recording of Mr. Furley telling Jack he has the pot he wanted is misinterpreted by police as a purchase of drugs instead of the actual terrine cookware.
143	15	"Star Struck"	Dave Powers	Lewis Colick	February 15, 1983	0716
Terri makes plans to marry a soap opera star (Dennis Cole), until Jack discovers that his sleazy reputation is well earned.
144	16	"Jack Goes the Distance"	Dave Powers	David Mirkin	February 22, 1983	0717
Jack challenges a guy who insulted Mr. Furley (Paul Sylvan) to a boxing match. But concerns rise when the girls learn that his opponent is a Golden Glove contender with 22 knockouts.
145	17	"Jack's Double Date"	Dave Powers	Budd Grossman and George Burdit	March 1, 1983	0715
Mr. Furley helps Jack lose his "I can stay away from women for a week" bet with the girls.
146	18	"Janet's Little Helper"	Dave Powers	David Mirkin	March 15, 1983	0719
Jack and Terri believe Janet is trying to seduce Mr. Furley's shy, young nephew (Brian Robbins).
147	19	"The Apartment"	Dave Powers	Shelley Zellman	March 22, 1983	0718
Instead of catching sleep in the dingy apartment above his restaurant, Jack catches Mr. Angelino with a young woman (Ilene Graff).
148	20	"Hair Today, Gone Tomorrow"	Dave Powers	Shelley Zellman	April 5, 1983	0720
Terri falls for Jack when he buys a fake moustache, because it makes Jack remind Terri of an old boyfriend.
149	21	"Navy Blues"	Dave Powers	Story by : C.C. Ryder, Joseph Staretski & Martin Rips; Teleplay by : Joseph Staretski & Martin Rips	May 3, 1983	0721
Bill (Rod McCary), a former cook in the Navy who worked alongside Jack, comes to town to con his way into a partnership in Jack's Bistro. Note: Richard Kline does not appear in this episode.
150	22	"Borrowing Trouble"	Dave Powers	Ellen Guylas	May 10, 1983	0722
The girls fake a contest to give Jack the rent money they think he needs for Jack's Bistro. Their good deed turns to disaster when Jack spends the money on a leather coat.

=== Season 8 (1983–84) ===
No. overall	No. in season	Title	Directed by	Written by	Original release date	Prod. code
151	1	"Jack, Be Quick"	Dave Powers	Joseph Staretski & Martin Rips	September 27, 1983	0803
Jack's girlfriend Cheryl (Joanna Kerns) asks him to father her child, but Jack refuses. Janet thinks Cheryl wants to marry Jack because she's going to have his baby, so she talks Jack into complying with Cheryl's wishes.
152	2	"She Loves Me; She Loves Me Not"	Michael Ross and Bob Priest	Babette Wilk & Arlan Gutenberg	October 4, 1983	0805
Larry discovers an answered magazine quiz and he and Jack think one of the girls wants to have an affair with Jack. They take the girls on a weekend trip to find out who answered the quiz so Jack can talk her out of it.
153	3	"The Money Machine"	Dave Powers	Mike Weinberger	October 18, 1983	0804
Jack receives $1,000 by mistake from an automated cash machine. He hides it in the couch for the weekend, not realizing that Mr. Furley plans to replace the couch later that day.
154	4	"Out on a Limb"	Dave Powers	David Mirkin	October 25, 1983	0801
Jack writes a nasty letter to a famous food critic (Ken Olfson), thinking the critic is going to give his bistro a ruinous review. When the critic assures Jack the review will be favorable, Jack tries to retrieve the letter from the critic's desk.
155	5	"Alias Jack Tripper"	Dave Powers	Mark Tuttle	November 1, 1983	0802
Jack has made two dates that will conflict with each other, so he talks Larry into posing as him and spending the day with his unwanted date: Janet's childhood friend Agnes Platt, who is visiting from out of town. Guest Stars: Rita Wilson as Agnes Platt and Lana Clarkson as Sharon Gordon
156	6	"Hearing Is Believing"	Dave Powers	Neal Marlens	November 8, 1983	0806
Jack is dating a therapist (Susan Walden) who wishes to keep her job a secret. Janet, who thinks she's a prostitute, is nasty to her and no one understands why - especially when Janet's father (Macon McCalman) has become so friendly with her.
157	7	"Grandma Jack"	Bob Priest and Michael Ross	Story by : Garry Ferrier & Aubrey Tadman; Teleplay by : Mike Weinberger	November 22, 1983	0810
Jack believes he has won a baking contest that is open only to women; so disguised in drag as "Grandma Tripper," he goes to claim the prize money, but learns he is a finalist and must bake his cookies for the company's executives to win the prize.
158	8	"Like Father, Like Son"	Dave Powers	Martin Rips & Joseph Staretski	November 29, 1983	0812
Jack's father, Jack Tripper, Sr. (Dick Shawn), visits unexpectedly and resumes his good-natured meddling. Jack explodes and tells him to stay out of his life; but when he learns his father has lost his job, Jack gives him the opportunity to be useful.
159	9	"The Odd Couples"	Dave Powers	Story by : Neal Marlens; Teleplay by : Ellen Guylas and Shelley Zellman	December 6, 1983	0813
Terri is up for a promotion and tells Dr. Kenderson (John Reilly) she is married to ward off his advances. When he invites himself and his wife (Judith-Marie Bergan) over for dinner, Jack poses as Terri's husband while Janet and Larry pose as their houseguests—a French-speaking married couple.
160	10	"Now You See It, Now You Don't"	Dave Powers	David Mirkin	December 13, 1983	0807
When Jack attends a charity ball with a socialite and loses $15,000 gambling, Larry and the girls attempt to help him recover the money.
161	11	"The Charming Stranger"	Dave Powers	Budd Grossman and George Burditt	December 20, 1983	0808
The girls flip over a handsome Englishman (Laurence Guittard) who moves in the building, but Jack becomes convinced that he is one of London's most wanted criminals.
162	12	"Janet Shapes Up"	Dave Powers	Joseph Staretski & Martin Rips	January 3, 1984	0809
Janet is thrilled with her new job as an aerobics teacher, and her new boss Tina is thrilled with Jack. When Tina blackmails Jack into being at her beck and call, Larry offers to take her off Jack's hands. Guest Stars: Victoria Carroll as Tina, Doug Shanklin as Ron and Jacque Lynn Colton as Plump Lady.
163	13	"Itching for Trouble"	Dave Powers	Sandy Krinski & Chet Dowling	January 10, 1984	0815
Jack meets an old flame (Greta Blackburn) at the park who is seeking advice about her jealous husband (Don Sparks). Furley joins them, and they all get poison oak. Later, at Jack's house, Furley tells the husband they were all in the bushes together.
164	14	"Baby, It's Cold Inside"	Dave Powers	Sandy Krinski & Chet Dowling	January 17, 1984	0814
During an after-hours robbery at Angelino's, Jack and Furley get locked in the freezer together. Convinced they are going to die, they have a heart-to-heart talk, and Jack confesses that he really is not gay. Once safe, Jack worries because Furley knows the truth about him. Guest Stars: Frank Schuller as Police Officer and Joe George as Crook.
165	15	"Look What I Found"	Dave Powers	David Mirkin	January 24, 1984	0811
The trio plants a stray cat at Furley's door, hoping he'll bend his rules and keep it. When a girl (Kaleena Kiff) appears looking for her kitten, Furley lies and says he took it to the pound; so Jack and the girls search the pounds and bring home three different cats.
166	16	"Jack's Tattoo"	Dave Powers	Robert Sternin, Prudence Fraser, Ron Bloomberg & Al Gordon	January 31, 1984	0817
After a night on the town with his old navy buddies, Jack discovers he has a tattoo on his derrière. When Jack goes to the hospital to have it removed, Janet thinks he is having a vasectomy and Furley thinks he is having a sex change. Eleanor Mondale has a small role as an unnamed medical student. Guest Stars: William Cort as Dr. Porter, Linda Hoy as Nurse Brown, Patty Freedman as Mother of Baby and Judy Walton as Nurse Johnson.
167	17	"Jack Takes Off"	Dave Powers	David Mirkin	February 21, 1984	0818
Jack offers to model for a beautiful art teacher (Sondra Currie) and finds himself nude in front of her classroom when Furley walks in. Jack begs Furley not to tell, but the secret is out when a nude portrait of Jack appears at the Regal Beagle.
168	18	"Forget Me Not"	Dave Powers	Story by : Budd Grossman & George Burditt; Teleplay by : David Mirkin	February 28, 1984	0816
Jack borrows Janet's new car to drive a gorgeous model (Taaffe O'Connell) to a photo session and totals the car on the way home. He pretends to have amnesia in the hospital, but Janet gets suspicious and concocts a plan to help him regain his memory.
169	19	"The Heiress"	Dave Powers	Joseph Staretski & Martin Rips	March 6, 1984	0819
A customer of the flower shop names Janet in his will, and she receives a vase. His nephew Phillip (David Ruprecht), an art collector, visits Janet, and Jack thinks he lied about the value of the vase and is trying to get it back.
170	20	"Cupid Works Overtime"	Dave Powers	George Burditt, Michael Ross and Bernard West	March 13, 1984	0820
Jack meets an attractive stewardess, Vicky Bradford (Mary Cadorette), but between her father (Robert Mandan) and her dates (John Martin), she doesn't seem to have time for Jack. Janet announces her engagement to Phillip, while Jack is lovesick over Vicky.
171	21	"Friends and Lovers"	Dave Powers	George Burditt, Michael Ross and Bernard West	September 18, 1984	0821
172	22	"Friends and Lovers"	Dave Powers	George Burditt, Michael Ross and Bernard West	September 18, 1984	0822
In the series finale, Janet is upset because she cannot have a church wedding, but Jack convinces her to have it at the apartment. Meanwhile, Jack thinks Vicky wants a job far away (due to her being misrepresented by her father), so he encourages her to take it. Vicky does not really care about the job and thinks Jack does not love her, thinking Jack encouraged her to take the job just to get rid of her. They initially break up, but Vicky interrupts Janet's wedding to tell Jack she still loves him and they realize they had a misunderstanding. They make up just before Janet tries to get them back together. During the wedding, Jack stands in for Janet's father to give her away to Philip, since neither of her parents were present. After Vicky catches the bridal bouquet, everyone heads downstairs for the reception hosted by Mr. Furley. Jack and Vicky lag behind; and especially since Vicky caught the bouquet, Jack sees this as an opening for him to propose to her. However, Vicky declines, explaining that her parents' failed marriage and fighting have scared her from marriage to anyone, though she still loves Jack. Instead, Vicky suggests that she and Jack live together; but Jack wants something more, which leads to a second breakup. When Terri sees Jack sulking outside Mr. Furley's door, she reminds Jack of his love for Vicky and that she is worth another chance, which reassures Jack into reconsidering living with Vicky. Fast-forward to one week later, after Janet's honeymoon. Larry is helping Jack and the girls pack for their move. Jack informs Mr. Furley that he will be moving into a one-bedroom apartment with a woman, indicating to Mr. Furley that he is no longer supposedly gay. Terri announces she will be moving to Hawaii to continue her career as a nurse, caring for sick natives. Janet, of course, goes home to her new husband. As they leave, the trio says goodbye to each other--and to the apartment (as indicated by the three of them taking one final look inside before stepping out the door). Later, Jack and Vicky are settling into their new apartment, which is upstairs above Jack's Bistro. They have a toast and Vicky invites a nervous Jack to bed. To calm him down, she says she is nervous as well. Just as they start to kiss, Vicky's father barges into the room, announcing that he has bought the restaurant from Mr. Angelino and he becomes Jack and Vicky's new landlord. Note: David Ruprecht, who played Philip (Janet's new husband), went on to become the host of the game show Supermarket Sweep. This episode marks the end of Three's Company and the beginning of Three's a Crowd.
