= They Died with Their Boots On =

1941 film by Raoul Walsh

- Theatrical release poster
- Directed by: Raoul Walsh
- Written by: Æneas MacKenzie; Wally Kline; Lenore J. Coffee (additional dialogue; uncredited)
- Produced by: Hal B. Wallis (executive producer); Robert Fellows (associate producer)
- Starring: Errol Flynn; Olivia de Havilland; Arthur Kennedy; Sydney Greenstreet
- Cinematography: Bert Glennon
- Edited by: William Holmes
- Music by: Max Steiner
- Production company: Warner Bros. Pictures
- Distributed by: Warner Bros. Pictures
- Release date: November 21, 1941 (United States)
- Running time: 140 minutes
- Country: United States
- Language: English
- Budget: $1.3 million
- Box office: $4 million (rentals)

They Died with Their Boots On is a 1941 American biographical western war film by director Raoul Walsh and starring Errol Flynn, Olivia de Havilland and Arthur Kennedy. It was made and distributed by Warner Bros. Pictures and produced by Hal B. Wallis and Robert Fellows.

The film's storyline offers a highly fictionalized account of the life of Gen. George Armstrong Custer, from the time he enters West Point military academy through the American Civil War and finally to his death at the Battle of the Little Bighorn. Custer is portrayed as a fun-loving, dashing figure who chooses honor and glory over money and corruption. The battle against Chief Crazy Horse (played by Anthony Quinn) is portrayed as a crooked deal between politicians and a corporation that wants the land Custer promised to the Native Americans.

The film was one of the top-grossing films of the year. They Died with Their Boots On was the eighth and final film collaboration between Errol Flynn and Olivia de Havilland in starring roles, although the two would guest star together in Thank Your Lucky Stars (1943). The supporting cast features Arthur Kennedy, Sydney Greenstreet (in his second film role) as Lt. Gen. Winfield Scott, Anthony Quinn as Crazy Horse, John Litel as Gen. Phillip Sheridan, Regis Toomey as Fitzhugh Lee, Joseph Crehan as President Ulysses S. Grant, and Hattie McDaniel.

== Plot ==
George Armstrong Custer (Flynn) arrives at West Point and is mistaken by his self-designed, outlandish uniform for a visiting dignitary. His academic career doesn't improve, and demerits for pranks and poor discipline accumulate. When the Civil War breaks out, Custer is at the bottom of his class.

Custer is unable to reply to Libbie Bacon who asks him for directions while he is on enforced silence. When his punishment ends he explains his rude silence, and asks to call on her that evening. When Custer's class is graduated early and ordered to report to Washington, D.C., for assignment, Custer misses his appointment with Libbie.

General Winfield Scott (Sydney Greenstreet) aids Custer in getting assigned to the 2nd U.S. Cavalry where he becomes a war hero after disregarding a superior's orders while defending a bridge. He returns to Monroe, Michigan on leave to meet Libbie at her home, but her father orders him away. Custer returns to his regiment, is mistakenly promoted to brigadier general and commands the Michigan Brigade at the Battle of Gettysburg, the first of many successes for him. Returning home to Monroe as a Union war hero, Custer marries Libbie but soon tires of civilian life and begins drinking too much. Libbie convinces Custer's old friend General Scott to commission Custer as a lieutenant colonel and send him west to the Dakota Territory.

When Custer arrives at Fort Lincoln with Libbie, he finds the drunken, rowdy, and undisciplined soldiers in need of firm leadership. His old West Point enemy, Ned Sharp (Arthur Kennedy), who has a government license to run the fort's trading post and saloon, is providing Winchester repeating rifles to the local Native Americans. Custer stops the rifle sales and permanently closes the saloon. He introduces a regimental song, "Garryowen", and U.S. 7th Cavalry under Custer's command engages Lakota warriors under tribal chief Crazy Horse (Anthony Quinn). The Lakota want a treaty to protect the sacred Black Hills. Custer and Washington sign the treaty. When Sharp's trading posts lose money, he conspires to spread a rumor of large gold deposits in the Black Hills. American settlers stream into the area in violation of the treaty. To embarrass Custer, who stands in the way of the settlers, Sharp passes out free liquor to Custer's men. They drunkenly pass in revue, in complete disarray, before Commissioner Taipe, a politician in league with Sharp. Custer is relieved of command when he punches Sharp and the commissioner.

Travelling to Washington for his Court martial Custer hears from Libbie about the Black Hills gold rush plan, realizing it has been fabricated to maximize profits for a select group of businesses. Custer takes the information to the U.S. Congress which ridicules him. When news arrives that the presence of gold miners has led to open conflict between the Lakota and U.S. troops, Custer appeals in person to President Ulysses S. Grant, one soldier to another, who restores him to command.

Upon returning to Fort Lincoln, Custer realizes his cavalry are the only chance at rescuing a force of U.S. infantry from a superior force of Lakota. Custer gives an emotional farewell to Libbie and leads the 7th Cavalry into action. Greatly outnumbered by more than 6000 Native American warriors, Custer and his meagre forces are killed. Corrupt politicians have goaded the western tribes into war for personal profit, threatening the survival of all white settlers in the Dakota Territories. Custer and his men have given their lives at the Battle of the Little Bighorn in order to slow the Native American advance. A letter left behind by Custer with Libbie, now considered his dying declaration, names the culprits and absolves the Native Americans of all responsibility.

== Cast ==
- Errol Flynn as George Armstrong Custer
- Olivia de Havilland as Elizabeth Bacon Custer
- Arthur Kennedy as Ned Sharp
- Charley Grapewin as California Joe
- Gene Lockhart as Samuel Bacon
- Anthony Quinn as Crazy Horse
- George P. Huntley Jr as Lt. "Queen's Own" Butler
- Stanley Ridges as Maj. Romulus Taipe
- John Litel as Gen. Phillip Sheridan
- Walter Hampden as William Sharp
- Sydney Greenstreet as Lt. Gen. Winfield Scott
- Regis Toomey as Fitzhugh Lee
- Hattie McDaniel as Callie
- Minor Watson as Sen. Smith
- Joseph Crehan as President Ulysses S. Grant

== Production ==
=== Development ===
The Warner Bros. script was an original screenplay and was announced in early 1941 as a vehicle for Errol Flynn. It was to be made after Warner's aviation film Dive Bomber, another feature starring Flynn.

=== Filming ===
The film is frequently confused with Michael Curtiz's Santa Fe Trail, released the previous year, in which Flynn portrayed Jeb Stuart and Ronald Reagan played Custer, also featuring Olivia de Havilland as Flynn's leading lady.

Three men were killed during the filming. One fell from a horse and broke his neck. Another stuntman had a heart attack. The third, actor Jack Budlong, insisted on using a real saber to lead a cavalry charge under artillery fire. When an explosive charge sent him flying off his horse, he landed on his sword, impaling himself. In September 1941, during filming, Flynn collapsed from exhaustion.

Jim Thorpe, who appears as an uncredited Native American warrior, reportedly had an off-camera fight with Errol Flynn, knocking him out with one punch.

The film reunited Gone With The Wind (1939) cast members Olivia de Havilland and Hattie McDaniel. De Havilland appeared in this film while simultaneously making The Male Animal (1942) starring Henry Fonda, putting the actress under enormous pressure from a heavy workload.

=== Custer's last stand ===
While the rest of the film was shot in locations in southern California, the filmmakers had hoped to capture this climactic sequence near the actual location of the Battle of the Little Bighorn. Owing to scheduling and budget constraints, however, the finale of the film was relegated to a rural area outside Los Angeles.

Crazy Horse, played by Anthony Quinn, is the only individualized Native American appearing in scenes. Quinn is one of the few actors of indigenous American descent in the film. Only 16 of the extras used were Lakota. The rest of the Native American warriors were mostly portrayed by Filipino extras.

=== Historical accuracy ===
The film shows Custer leading his troops in a saber charge, in the course of which they are surrounded and Custer, being the last man alive, is killed. In reality, the men had boxed their sabers and sent them to the rear before the battle; site evidence, along with some Native American accounts, indicates that Custer may have been among the first to die. He is also shown during the battle with his trademark long hair when, in reality, he had cut it short just prior to the Little Bighorn campaign. Several members of Custer's family (his brothers Thomas and Boston, his brother-in-law James Calhoun and nephew Henry Reed) also died in the battle but are not depicted in the drama.

Custer is portrayed as completely devoted and faithful to his wife Libby but was in reality alleged to have unofficially married an Indian woman named Mo-nah-se-tah during his campaign against the Cheyenne and had children with her. However, some historians contend that he had become sterile after contracting venereal disease at West Point and that the father was really his brother Thomas.

The film also, however, accurately portrays Custer as sympathetic to the Indians situation at being forced to give up their lands to the incoming white settlers. He also said that, if he were an Indian, he would fight the encroaching white expansion, which is said in the film, and spoke out against the abuses they had to suffer on the reservations. As depicted, he was considered by many higher-ranking officers to be a glory-seeking troublemaker.

=== Soundtrack ===
The film score was composed by Max Steiner. He adapted George Armstrong Custer's favorite song, "Garryowen", for use in the score. Custer knew the song while he was at West Point, where he is said to have performed it in a talent show. In the film, however, Custer hears the song for the first time being played on a piano by former English soldier, now a U.S. Army officer, Lt. "Queen's Own" Butler. This connection is apocryphal. It is actually a traditional Irish drinking song, much beloved by the cavalry for its galloping rhythm. Warner Brothers recycled some of the film's music, and variations of it can be heard in Silver River and Rocky Mountain, both starring Errol Flynn, and The Searchers starring John Wayne.

=== Box office ===
They Died with Their Boots On grossed $1,871,000 in the United States and $2,143,000 overseas. Its total receipts of $4,014,000 was the studio's third largest of the season. It made the studio a profit of $1.5 million.

== Reception ==
Alex von Tunzelmann, writing for The Guardian in 2009, stated that "More errors riddle this biopic of General Custer than bullets flew at the Battle of Little Big Horn". FilmInk magazine argued that "Flynn gives one of his finest performances, taking Custer on a genuine emotional journey from silly boy to grown man". The film has a 75% rating in Rotten Tomatoes, based on twelve reviews.

== Home media ==
Like with Errol Flynn's earlier film, 1940's The Sea Hawk, They Died With Their Boots On was colorized in the late 1980s. This version was released on VHS tape in 1998 by Turner Home Entertainment and Warner Home Video. The original black-and-white film was released on DVD in 2005 by Turner Home Entertainment and Warner Home Video. The Warner Archive Collection released the Blu-ray disc of the film in 2025.

== See also ==
- The Scarlet West (1925)
- General Custer at the Little Big Horn (1926)
- Little Big Man (1970)
- List of films and television shows about the American Civil War
