= Paul Wayne =

Canadian screenwriter (born 1932)

- Born: Paul Weinberg; 17 January 1932 (age 94); Toronto, Ontario, Canada
- Occupation: Screenwriter
- Writing career
- Language: English
- Notable work: Three's Company
- Notable awards: Writing (Comedy or Variety); 1969 The Smothers Brothers Comedy Hour

Paul Wayne (born Paul Weinberg; 17 January 1932) is a Canadian writer. He wrote sketches of television variety shows, like The Smothers Brothers Comedy Hour that he won an Emmy Award for, and episodes of other television shows, like Three's Company. He also served as producer of only two short-lived sitcoms, Doc and Excuse My French.

== Career ==
All together with his writing partner George Burditt and other writing crew, they earned Emmy Award nominations for Outstanding Writing for a Variety or Music Series: The Sonny & Cher Comedy Hour in 1972 and 1974, and Van Dyke and Company in 1977, a variety show starring Dick Van Dyke. Wayne and Burditt co-wrote mainly the first three seasons (1977–79) of the television series Three's Company, Both together co-wrote one episode of All in the Family, "Archie Eats and Runs" (1974), and another episode of Sanford and Son (alongside Aaron Ruben), "The Way to Lamont's Heart" (1974).

Individually or with other writers, Wayne wrote episodes of The Andy Griffith Show, Bewitched, The Flying Nun, That Girl, Welcome Back, Kotter, and Benson. He wrote "From Paradise Direct", a 1964 episode of the Canadian teleplay series Playdate about an angel mistaking a man as the leprechaun. He and Joseph Hoffmann wrote the 1967 film The King's Pirate, based on the 1952 film Against All Flags, written by Hoffman and Aeneas MacKenzie. In 1969, he was awarded an Outstanding Writing in a Comedy Variety for The Smothers Brothers Comedy Hour. He created and produced the Canadian English-French sitcom Excuse My French (1974–76). He served as a producer of Doc (1975–76).

== Awards and nominations ==
- 21st Primetime Emmy Awards, 1969 — Outstanding Writing Achievement in Comedy, Variety, The Smothers Brothers Comedy Hour (Winner)
- 24th Primetime Emmy Awards, 1972 — Outstanding Writing Achievement in Variety or Music, The Sonny & Cher Comedy Hour (Nominated)
- 26th Primetime Emmy Awards, 1974 — Best Writing in Variety or Music, The Sonny & Cher Comedy Hour (Nominated)
- 29th Primetime Emmy Awards, 1977 — Outstanding Writing in a Comedy-Variety or Music Series, Van Dyke and Company (Nominated)
