= The King's Pirate =

1967 film by Don Weis

- Theatrical poster
- Directed by: Don Weis
- Screenplay by: Paul Wayne; Æneas MacKenzie; Joseph Hoffman
- Story by: Æneas MacKenzie
- Produced by: Robert Arthur
- Starring: Doug McClure; Jill St. John; Guy Stockwell
- Cinematography: Clifford Stine
- Edited by: Russell F. Schoengarth
- Music by: Ralph Ferraro
- Color process: Technicolor
- Production company: Universal Pictures
- Distributed by: Universal Pictures
- Release date: August 1967
- Running time: 100 minutes
- Country: United States
- Language: English

The King's Pirate is a 1967 American swashbuckler pirate film directed by Don Weis and starring Doug McClure, Jill St. John and Guy Stockwell. It is a remake of the 1952 film Against All Flags.

== Plot ==
A British naval officer volunteers for a dangerous mission to infiltrate the base of pirates who threaten shipping off Madagascar.

== Cast ==
- Doug McClure as Lt. Brian Fleming
- Jill St. John as Mistress Jessica Stephens
- Guy Stockwell as John Avery
- Mary Ann Mobley as Princess Patna
- Kurt Kasznar as Zucco
- Richard Deacon as Swaine
- Torin Thatcher as Captain Cullen
- Diana Chesney as Molvina MacGregor
- Ivor Barry as Cloudsly
- William Glover as Captain Hornsby (as Bill Glover)
- Woodrow Parfrey as Gow
- Sean McClory as Sparkes
- Émile Genest as Captain Mission
- Ted de Corsia as Capt. McTigue
- Alex Montoya as Caraccioli
- Tanya Lemani as Member of Zucco's Troop
- Ami Luce as Member of Zucco's Troop
- Bob Terhune as Member of Zucco's Troop (as Robert Terhune)
- Chuck Couch as Member of Zucco's Troop
- Bill Couch as Member of Zucco's Troop (as William J. Couch)
- Loren Janes as Member of Zucco's Troop
- Henry Monzello as Member of Zucco's Troop (as Hank Monzello)
- William R. Snyder as Member of Zucco's Troop (as William Snyder)
- Rodney Hoeltzel as Member of Zucco's Troop
- Danny Rees as Member of Zucco's Troop

== Production ==
Paul Wayne rewrote the script for Against All Flags adding some new characters, notably Zucco (played by Kurt Kaznar). Doug McClure was making The Virginian at the time but was written out of the show to allow him to make the movie. Filming started late October 1966.

Female lead Jill St John was under contract to Universal at the time. It was her sixth picture that year after Fame is the Name of the Game, How I Spent My Summer Vacation, The Liquidator, Eight on a Lam, and Banning. She took fencing lessons for the role. Filming ended in December.

== See also ==
- List of American films of 1967
