= Ivanhoe (1952 film) =

1952 film by Richard Thorpe

- Theatrical release poster
- Directed by: Richard Thorpe
- Screenplay by: Aeneas MacKenzie; Noel Langley; Marguerite Roberts
- Based on: Ivanhoe; 1819 novel by Sir Walter Scott
- Produced by: Pandro S. Berman
- Starring: Robert Taylor; Elizabeth Taylor; Joan Fontaine; George Sanders; Emlyn Williams
- Cinematography: Freddie Young
- Edited by: Frank Clarke
- Music by: Miklós Rózsa
- Color process: Technicolor
- Production company: Metro-Goldwyn-Mayer
- Distributed by: Loew's Inc.
- Release date: July 31, 1952 (New York)
- Running time: 107 minutes
- Countries: United Kingdom; United States
- Language: English
- Budget: $3,737,000
- Box office: $9,737,000

Ivanhoe is a 1952 Technicolor epic historical adventure film directed by Richard Thorpe, produced by Pandro S. Berman and starring Robert Taylor, Elizabeth Taylor, Joan Fontaine, George Sanders and Emlyn Williams. The screenplay was written by Aeneas MacKenzie, Marguerite Roberts and Noel Langley based on the 1819 historical novel Ivanhoe by Walter Scott.

The film is the first in an unofficial trilogy by the same director, producer and star (Robert Taylor), along with Knights of the Round Table (1953) and The Adventures of Quentin Durward (1955). All three films were produced at MGM-British Studios at Borehamwood, Hertfordshire, near London.

In 1951, Roberts, a former communist, was allegedly blacklisted after refusing to testify before the House Un-American Activities Committee. MGM received permission from the Screen Writers Guild to remove her credit from the film, which has since been restored.

== Plot ==
Richard the Lionheart, the Norman king of England, vanishes while returning from the Crusades. One of his knights, the Saxon Wilfred of Ivanhoe, searches for him, finally finding him held captive by Leopold of Austria for an enormous ransom. Richard's treacherous brother Prince John knows about it but does nothing, enjoying ruling in his absence.

Back in England, Ivanhoe, pretending to be a minstrel, meets Sir Brian de Bois-Guilbert and Sir Hugh de Bracy, two of Prince John's Norman supporters. When the party seeks shelter for the night, Ivanhoe leads them to Rotherwood, the home of his father, Cedric the Saxon, who welcomes the knights coldly while Ivanhoe sneaks into the chamber of the Lady Rowena, Cedric's ward, and they kiss. Later, in private, Ivanhoe pleads with Cedric to help raise the ransom of 150,000 marks of silver, but Cedric wants no part of assisting any Norman. When Ivanhoe leaves, Wamba, Cedric's jester, asks to accompany him and is made his squire. Later, they rescue the Jew Isaac of York, another of Cedric's guests, from two Norman soldiers. Shaken, Isaac returns home to Sheffield, and Ivanhoe escorts him.

Isaac's daughter Rebecca gives Ivanhoe her jewels without her father's knowledge to buy a horse and armor for an important jousting tournament intended to strengthen support for Prince John. Many nobles are at the tournament, including Prince John. The Norman knights Brian de Bois-Guilbert, Hugh de Bracy, Front de Boeuf, Philip de Malvoisin and Ralph de Vipont defeat all Saxon opponents. Then a mysterious Saxon knight appears, dressed in black, his face hidden behind his helm. He declines to provide his name but challenges all five Normans. He easily defeats Malvoisin, Vipont and Front de Boeuf in succession.

When Ivanhoe salutes Rebecca, Bois-Guilbert is immediately smitten by her beauty. While Ivanhoe bests Bracy, he is seriously wounded in the shoulder. By this point, his identity has been guessed by his father and Robin Hood. In the last bout against Bois-Guilbert, Ivanhoe falls from his horse and is taken to the woods under the protection of Robin Hood. The other Saxons, led by Cedric, head for the city of York but are captured and taken to the castle of Front de Boeuf. When Ivanhoe hears the news, he surrenders himself up in exchange for his father's freedom. Ivanhoe advises Cedric that Robin Hood and his men have the castle surrounded. However, Bois-Guilbert treacherously keeps them both. Robin Hood's men storm the castle. In the fighting, Front de Boeuf drives Wamba to his death in a burning part of the castle and is slain in turn by Ivanhoe. The defense crumbles, and Bois-Guilbert alone escapes, using Rebecca as a human shield. De Bracy is captured when he attempts to do the same with Rowena.

The huge ransom is finally amassed, but the Jews face a cruel choice: to free either Richard or Rebecca, for Prince John has set the price of her life at 100,000 marks, their contribution. Isaac chooses Richard, and Cedric takes the ransom to Leopold of Austria, while Ivanhoe promises Isaac that he will rescue Rebecca.

At Rebecca's trial, she is condemned to be burned at the stake as a witch, but Ivanhoe appears and challenges the verdict, invoking the right to wager of battle. Prince John chooses Bois-Guilbert as the court's champion. Bois-Guilbert makes a last plea to Rebecca, offering to forfeit the duel in return for her love, although it means that he will be forever disgraced, but she refuses.

In the duel, Ivanhoe is knocked from his horse but kills Bois-Guilbert with a battle axe. As he lies dying, Bois-Guilbert tells Rebecca that it is he who loves her, not Ivanhoe. Rebecca acknowledges this to Rowena.

King Richard and his knights arrive to reclaim his throne. Prince John grudgingly kneels before his brother. Richard then beseeches his kneeling subjects to rise, not as Normans or Saxons, but as Englishmen.

== Cast ==
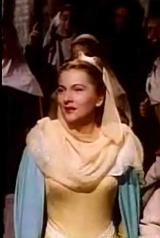
Rowena (Joan Fontaine) at the tournament at Ashby.

- Robert Taylor as Ivanhoe
- Elizabeth Taylor as Rebecca
- Joan Fontaine as Rowena
- George Sanders as De Bois-Guilbert
- Emlyn Williams as Wamba / The Narrator (uncredited)
- Robert Douglas as Sir Hugh de Bracy
- Finlay Currie as Cedric
- Felix Aylmer as Isaac
- Francis de Wolff as Front de Boeuf
- Norman Wooland as King Richard
- Basil Sydney as Waldemar Fitzurse
- Harold Warrender as Locksley / Robin Hood
- Patrick Holt as Philip de Malvoisin
- Roderick Lovell as Ralph de Vipont
- Sebastian Cabot as Clerk of Copmanhurst
- John Ruddock as Hundebert
- Michael Brennan as Baldwin
- Megs Jenkins as Servant to Isaac
- Valentine Dyall as Norman Guard
- Lionel Harris as Roger of Bermondsley
- Carl Jaffe as Austrian Monk
- Guy Rolfe as Prince John
- May Hallatt as Elgitha (uncredited)
- Robert Brown as Castle Guard at Torquilstone (uncredited)
- Martin Benson as Jewish Delegate (uncredited)
- Jack Churchill as Archer on the Walls of Torquilstone (uncredited)

== Production ==
In 1951, the film's main scriptwriter Marguerite Roberts was subpoenaed by the House Un-American Activities Committee along with her husband John Sanford. They each cited the Fifth Amendment and refused to answer questions, although both were former members of the Communist Party USA. Consequently, they were both allegedly blacklisted, and MGM received permission from the Screen Writers Guild to remove Roberts' credit from the film. She did not work again in Hollywood for nine years.

Scenes were filmed on soundstages at MGM-British Studios, Borehamwood, Hertfordshire, and on location at Doune Castle, Scotland. Both the Ashby-de-la-Zouch tournament and the Torquilstone Castle siege were shot on the large Borehamwood backlot. Woodland scenes were shot in Ashridge Forest, Hertfordshire and Buckinghamshire. The studio hired Jack Churchill, a British World War II army officer renowned for carrying a Scottish broadsword, longbow and bagpipes into battle, to appear as an archer shooting from the walls of Warwick Castle.

The film omits several characters from Walter Scott's novel and introduces a company of crusaders who do not appear in the book. King Richard is not depicted until the final scene of the film, but he is a consistent character in the novel. Many other variations from the original book exist in the film.

== Music ==
Miklós Rózsa's score is among his most highly regarded, and it received both Academy Award and Golden Globe nominations. However, Rózsa was disappointed with the film's treatment of Scott's novel, as he explained in his 1982 autobiography: "It was a typical Hollywood historical travesty and the picture for the most part was cliche-ridden and conventional." The score was influenced by various medieval sources, particularly those of the 12th century. The opening narration includes a theme written by Richard the Lionhearted.

== Release ==
Ivanhoe premiered at Radio City Music Hall in New York on July 31, 1952.

== Reception ==
In a contemporary review for The New York Times, critic Bosley Crowther wrote:

Producer Pandro S. Berman and Metro-Goldwyn-Mayer have fetched a motion picture that does them, Scott and English history proud. The credits should redound in that order, for it must be ungrudgingly agreed that those who emerge most triumphant are the producers of this film—they and the myriad able craftsmen and actors who helped to achieve this brilliantly colored tapestry of drama and spectacle ... Most conspicuous in this picture, however ... is the integrity and candor with which the original sub-theme of anti-Semitism in medieval England is treated and shown. ... In this aspect of the drama, a remarkable forcefulness is achieved and the picture brings off a serious lesson in fairness and tolerance not customary in spectacle films. ... Main interest of the picture, however, is the elegant and action-crammed display of knightly jousts and sieges and the bloody sports of kings. And for this we are much obliged to Metro, which has herein brought to the screen almost as fine a panorama of medievalism as Laurence Olivier gave us in "Henry V."

The film set an opening-week record at Radio City Music Hall with a gross of $177,000. In its opening 39 days, the film earned $1,310,590 at the box office, setting a new record for an MGM film. According to studio records, it earned $5,810,000 in the U.S. and Canada and $5,086,000 elsewhere, resulting in a profit of $2,762,000. It was MGM's biggest earner for 1952 and one of the top four revenue-generating films of the year. It was also the fourth-most popular film in England in 1952.

== Awards ==
Pandro S. Berman, and Miklós Rózsa were nominated for Academy Awards, for Best Picture, Best Cinematography, Color, and Best Music, Scoring, respectively. In addition, Richard Thorpe was nominated by the Directors Guild of America, USA, for Outstanding Directorial Achievement in Motion Pictures. There were also two Golden Globe Award nominations: Best Film Promoting International Understanding and Best Motion Picture Score, for Miklós Rózsa.

Award	Category	Nominee(s)	Result	Ref.
Academy Awards	Best Picture	Pandro S. Berman	Nominated	
Academy Awards	Best Cinematography, Color	Freddie Young	Nominated	
Academy Awards	Best Music, Scoring	Miklós Rózsa	Nominated	
Directors Guild of America Awards	Outstanding Directorial Achievement in Motion Pictures	Richard Thorpe	Nominated	
Golden Globe Awards	Best Film Promoting International Understanding		Nominated	
Golden Globe Awards	Best Motion Picture Score	Miklós Rózsa	Nominated	

== Comic-book adaptions ==
- Fawcett Movie Comic #20 (December 1952): Consists of 32 pages including covers, artist unknown.
- Sun (weekly comic magazine, Amalgamated Press, London) #177, June 28, 1952 and #197, November 15, 1952: Includes 21 issues with 42 pages in full color, illustrated by Patrick Nicolle.

== See also ==
- List of American films of 1952
