= Against All Flags =

1952 film by George Sherman

- 1952 film poster by Reynold Brown
- Directed by: George Sherman; Douglas Sirk
- Written by: Joseph Hoffman; Aeneas MacKenzie
- Produced by: Howard Christie
- Starring: Errol Flynn; Maureen O'Hara
- Cinematography: Russell Metty
- Edited by: Frank Gross
- Music by: Hans J. Salter
- Production company: Universal-International
- Distributed by: Universal Pictures
- Release date: December 24, 1952 (New York)
- Running time: 84 minutes
- Country: United States
- Language: English
- Box office: $1.6 million (U.S.); 1,993,068 admissions (France)

Against All Flags is a 1952 American swashbuckler pirate film directed by George Sherman with uncredited assistance from Douglas Sirk and starring Errol Flynn, Maureen O'Hara and Anthony Quinn. The film is set in 1700 on the coast of Madagascar.

== Plot ==
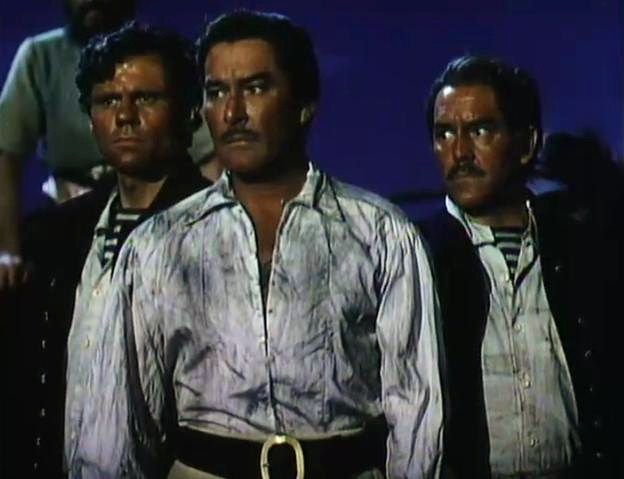
John Alderson, Errol Flynn and Phil Tully

British naval officer Brian Hawke volunteers with two other seamen to infiltrate a pirate base on Madagascar, but when they arrive, they arouse suspicion. Pirate captain Roc Brasiliano orders Hawke before a tribunal to decide his fate. Hawke has caught the eye of Spitfire Stevens, the only woman among the coast captains, which arouses Brasiliano's jealousy. To prove himself at the tribunal, Hawke wins a duel with another pirate and his case is dismissed. He then joins Brasiliano's crew.

While cruising the shipping lanes, they capture a Moghul vessel crammed with vast wealth. Patma, the daughter of the Moghul emperor, disguised by her chaperone as a common woman, is left aboard the burning vessel. When Hawke rescues her, Patma falls in love with him, revealing that he is only the third man whom she has ever seen. Back on Madagascar, Patma is sold at auction. Spitfire outbids Hawke, who only wanted to protect her from the other pirates. Later, Spitfire tells Hawke that she is leaving her criminal life behind and wants Hawke to accompany her to Britain via Brazil.

Brasiliano's hatred for Hawke grows, but Hawke is more concerned with completing his mission and steals a map of the pirates' defenses. A Royal Navy warship will sail into the harbor, and Hawke will disable the coastal cannons. Hawke signals the British ship with a flare and ensures that Patma is ready to be rescued, but his plans are uncovered by Brasiliano. Hawke and his two accomplices are tied to a stake on the beach to be bitten by crabs and drowned, but Spitfire saves them. A British warship enters the bay, and the pirates expect to easily sink it, but its double-shotted cannons explode. Faced with imminent defeat and execution, Brasiliano uses the princess as a human shield to sail away. However, Hawke and his men slip aboard, rescue the Patma and fight the crew with Spitfire's help. Hawke eventually duels and kills Brasiliano. After the battle, he requests and is granted Spitfire's freedom, and they kiss.

== Cast ==
- Errol Flynn as Brian Hawke
- Maureen O'Hara as Prudence "Spitfire" Stevens
- Anthony Quinn as Captain Roc Brasiliano
- Alice Kelley as Princess Patma
- Mildred Natwick as Molvina MacGregor
- Robert Warwick as Captain William Kidd
- Harry Cording as Gow
- John Alderson as Jonathan Harris
- Phil Tully as Jones
- Lester Matthews as Sir Cloudsley
- Tudor Owen as Williams
- Maurice Marsac as Captain Moisson
- James Craven as Captain Hornsby
- James Fairfax as Cruikshank – Barber
- Bill Radovich as Hassan

== Production ==
The screenplay was originally written by Aeneas MacKenzie and director Richard Wallace as a vehicle for Douglas Fairbanks Jr., who had recently appeared in Wallace's film Sinbad the Sailor. In January 1950, it was announced that Fairbanks' production company would begin filming in April or May in Hollywood after he finished State Secret in England. However, the film was not produced and Aeneas MacKenzie sold his original script to Universal in July 1950. Alexis Smith and Yvonne De Carlo were mentioned as possible female leads and Jack Gross was assigned as producer. The script featured a number of tropes familiar to pirate movies of the time, including a female pirate, and very loosely reflected genuine historical characters.

William Goetz, head of production, shelved the project until he could find the right star. In August 1951, Errol Flynn signed a one-picture deal with the studio to make the film. Under his contract with Warner Bros., Flynn was allowed to appear in one film a year for an outside studio. His contract with Universal meant that Flynn was entitled to a percentage of the profits. Filming was delayed so that Flynn could star in Mara Maru at Warner Bros. During this time, the script was rewritten by Joseph Hoffman, and Anthony Quinn signed to play the villain. By November, Howard Christie was set as producer, George Sherman as director and Maureen O'Hara the female lead.

Sherman later wrote that Flynn was unsure about the scene in which he fenced against a woman. He said: "I'm supposed to be the bravest guy on screen? How could I fight a woman?" Sherman had previously worked with O'Hara and assured Flynn that she was capable of holding her own "with a sword, a gun or her fists if need be", warning Flynn that he needed to be in shape. The film marks Flynn's last Hollywood swashbuckler role, as his next three in the genre (The Master of Ballantrae, The Dark Avenger and the unfinished The Story of William Tell) were produced in Europe.

Filming began in January 1952 on a soundstage at Universal Studios in Los Angeles. Location footage was shot in Palos Verdes, California.

Flynn exercised an increased degree of authority on set as a result of changes to his contract. One change stipulated that he could stop working at 4.00 p.m., by which time he had often become inebriated. O'Hara was wary of working with Flynn after he had tried to seduce her years earlier. However, she recalled that by the end of filming, "he had won me over. I respected him professionally and was quite fond of him personally. Father Time was slowly calming his wicked, wicked ways, and deep within that devilish rogue, I found a kind and fragile soul." O'Hara had to perform many of her closeups for love scenes opposite a black flag with a marker while a script girl read Flynn's lines.

On February 1, Flynn broke his ankle during filming, with ten more days of production remaining, most of it featuring him, so completion of the film was delayed. The ship shown in the film had been transformed for the film Yankee Buccaneer (1952) and had to be reverted to its previous state. On April 18, Flynn returned to shoot the remaining sequences over two days. Because Sherman was working on Back at the Front (1952) by then, the scenes were directed by Douglas Sirk.

Anthony Quinn claimed to have begun an affair with O'Hara while appearing in Sinbad the Sailor (1947) and that every time they worked together again, they would temporarily resume their affair.

== Reception ==
In a contemporary review for The New York Times, critic A. H. Weiler wrote: "There is only one matter that rates criticism. Mr. Flynn, it appears, has, by some clever maneuvering, saved the life of Patma, the gorgeous Princess of Ormuz and daµghter of the Mogul of India. That fair Eastern flower when kissed by the swashbuckling corsair passionately asks if he might be a prince. To which our handsome freebooter answers: 'No, I'm just a man.' This self-effacement is uncalled for. Mr. Flynn is a singular man among men and Maureen O'Hara as a jealous and discerning spitfire, who is beautiful putty in his hands, is perfect proof of same."

The Chicago Tribune called the film "the dressiest assemblage of pirates ever to sail under the flag of the skull and crossbones" and "routine and ridiculous".

The film earned $1.6 million in gross rentals in North America in 1953.

== Remakes ==
The film was remade in 1967 as The King's Pirate.
