= Aeneas MacKenzie =

Scottish-American screenwriter

Aeneas MacKenzie, or Æneas MacKenzie (August 15, 1889 in Stornoway, Scotland – June 2, 1962 in Los Angeles), was a Scottish-American screenwriter. MacKenzie wrote many notable Hollywood films, including: The Private Lives of Elizabeth and Essex (1939), They Died with Their Boots On (1941), Ivanhoe (1952), and The Ten Commandments (1956).

== Career ==
MacKenzie came from England to work on a film of East Lynne.

In January 1938, he was under contract to Warner Bros. to write what would become Juarez. In February 1939, he was working on a biopic of John Paul Jones for James Cagney. He also wrote a biopic of Disraeli for Claude Rains. Neither were made, but by July 1940, he was working on a biopic of George Custer which became They Died with Their Boots On. MacKenzie wrote The Widow of Devil's Island for Bette Davis. In March 1942, he was working on a movie about "Sing Sing" prison.

In October 1943, RKO announced they would make a film from his original story, The Spanish Main.

In July 1946, he wrote a script of Ivanhoe for Paramount. The project was postponed due to the Palestine Cris and instead MacKenzie was assigned to do a biopic on Ludwig II for producer Robert Fellows. A year later, his Ivanhoe script was sold to RKO. They sold it to MGM who filmed it several years later.

He worked on the script for The Black Book (1949).

In January 1950, he sold a script to Douglas Fairbanks Jr which became Against All Flags. Several months later, MacKenzie sold this story to Universal, who hired him to write the script. Also at Universal, he did The Prince Who Was a Thief.

MacKenzie later headed the script team on The Ten Commandments.

In July 1957, he was writing Peter and Catherine about Russia in the 18th century for Ross Hunter at Universal.

In late 1958, MacKenzie was reported to be working on a biopic of William the Conqueror for Evyan Perfumes.

== Filmography ==
- Juarez (1939)
- The Private Lives of Elizabeth and Essex (1939)
- They Died with Their Boots On (1941)
- The Navy Comes Through (1942)
- The Woman of the Town (1943)
- The Fighting Seabees (1944)
- Buffalo Bill (1944)
- Back to Bataan (1945)
- The Spanish Main (1945)
- Reign of Terror (1949)
- The Avengers (1950)
- Captain Horatio Hornblower R.N. (1951)
- The Prince Who Was a Thief (1951)
- Ivanhoe (1952)
- Face to Face (1952)
- Against All Flags (1952)
- L'amante di Paride (Loves of Three Queens) (1954)
- The Ten Commandments (1956)
- The King's Pirate (1967)
