= Little Rock (Cheyenne chief) =

Cheyenne chief

Little Rock (in Cheyenne, recorded by the Smithsonian as Hō-hăn-ĭ-no-o′; (Note: This name may be Ho'honánoo'o, meaning "Fry-stone," describing heated small stones used in frying, baking, boiling, etc. (cf. Ojibwe: asiniibwaan). The Cheyenne name "Little Rock" itself is Ho'honáhke. (See Cheyenne Names Archived 2007-09-03 at the Wayback Machine by Wayne Leman.)) c. 1805 – 1868) was a council chief of the Wutapiu band of Southern Cheyennes. He was the only council chief who remained with Black Kettle following the Sand Creek massacre of 1864.

Little Rock was a signatory of the Medicine Lodge Treaty of 1867. In August 1868, Little Rock was interviewed at Fort Lyon by Indian agent Edward W. Wynkoop about raids by a large Cheyenne war party on white settlements along the Saline and Solomon in Kansas. Little Rock gave Wynkoop information about those responsible for the raids, which included members of several different Cheyenne bands including that of Black Kettle, and agreed to try to persuade the other Cheyenne chiefs and headmen to surrender the raids' leaders to U.S. authorities, in accordance with the terms of the Medicine Lodge Treaty. In case he was unable to persuade the chiefs and headmen to give up the responsible men, Little Rock asked if Wynkoop would take him and his family under Wynkoop's protection, which Wynkoop agreed to.

With Black Kettle, Little Rock attended a conference at Fort Cobb, Indian Territory (present-day Oklahoma) with Maj. Gen. William B. Hazen on November 20, 1868, at which Black Kettle sought but was refused permission to come in to Fort Cobb in order to avoid war with the U.S. Army. A week later, in the Battle of Washita River of November 27, 1868, Black Kettle's and Little Rock's camp on the Washita River was attacked at dawn by the 7th U.S. Cavalry Regiment under the command of Lt. Col. George Armstrong Custer. Little Rock, whose lodge was at the eastern edge of the village, joined with the Cheyenne warrior She Wolf and a visiting Kiowa warrior Trails the Enemy to form a rear guard to protect women and children fleeing downriver from attacking cavalrymen, believed to have been a detachment under Maj. Joel H. Elliott. Little Rock was killed in the action. He was survived by his wife Skunk Woman, his daughter Mo-nah-se-tah (or Me-o-tzi, Spring Grass), his mother, his sister White Buffalo Woman, and another sister. Of these, his mother and his daughter Mo-nah-se-tah were among the 53 women and children taken captive by the 7th Cavalry.
