= Mo-nah-se-tah =

Cheyenne woman

- Mónȧhtsetá'e

Cheyenne leader

Personal details
- Born: c. 1850
- Died: 1922
- Domestic partner: George Armstrong Custer (?)
- Parent(s): Father, Little Rock
- Known for: Taken captive by the 7th U.S. Cavalry under the command of Lt. Colonel (brevet Major General) George Armstrong Custer after the Battle of Washita River

Mo-nah-se-tah or Mo-nah-see-tah (Cheyenne: Mónȧhtsetá'e; c. 1850 – 1922), aka Me-o-tzi, was the daughter of the Cheyenne chief Little Rock. Her father was killed on November 28, 1868, in the Battle of Washita River when the camp of Chief Black Kettle, of which Little Rock was a member, was attacked by the 7th U.S. Cavalry under the command of Lieutenant Colonel George Armstrong Custer. Mo-nah-se-tah was among the 53 Cheyenne women and children taken captive by the 7th Cavalry after the battle.

According to Captain Frederick Benteen, chief of scouts Ben Clark, and Cheyenne oral history, Custer "cohabited" with teenage Mo-nah-se-tah during the winter and early spring of 1868–1869 after she and many other Southern Cheyenne women were captured by the US Army at Washita. Mo-nah-se-tah gave birth to a child in January 1869, two months after Washita; Cheyenne oral history alleges that she later bore a second child, fathered by Custer, in late 1869. Custer, however, had apparently become sterile after contracting venereal disease at West Point, leading some historians to believe that the father was really his brother Thomas.

== Battle of the Washita ==
At daybreak on November 27, 1868, the 7th U.S. Cavalry under the command of Lieutenant Colonel George Custer attacked a Cheyenne camp of 51 lodges on the Washita River in Indian Territory (present-day Oklahoma). Custer's troops were able to take control of the village quickly, but it took longer to quell all remaining resistance. Women and children were killed, as Custer acknowledged in his report of the battle, and troops directed to take other women and children who had been captured to a designated lodge in the village to be held under guard as the battle continued. One of the scouts, Raphael Romero, was sent to assure those women and children who had remained in their lodges during the attack that they would not be harmed. A total of fifty-three women and children were taken captive. There is credible evidence that, following the attack, Custer and his men sexually assaulted female captives. One historian writes, "There was a saying among the soldiers of the western frontier, a saying Custer and his officers could heartily endorse: 'Indian women rape easy.'"

== Account by White Cow Bull (Lakota) ==
In 1938, Joseph White Cow Bull, an Oglala Lakota veteran of the Battle of the Little Bighorn, went with David Humphreys Miller to the Little Bighorn battlefield and recounted to him his recollections of the battle. Among his recollections:

While we were together in this village [on the Little Bighorn River], I spent most of my time with the Shahiyela [Cheyenne] since I knew their tongue and their ways almost as well as my own. In all those years I had never taken a wife, although I had had many women. One woman I wanted was a pretty young Shahiyela named Monahseetah, or Meotxi as I called her. She was in her middle twenties but had never married any man of her tribe. Some of my Shahiyela friends said she was from the southern branch of their tribe, just visiting up north, and they said no Shahiyela could marry her because she had a seven-year-old son born out of wedlock and that tribal law forbade her getting married. They said the boy’s father had been a white soldier chief named Long Hair; he had killed her father, Chief Black Kettle [sic], in a battle in the south [Battle of the Washita] eight winters before, they said, and captured her. He had told her he wanted to make her his second wife, and so he had her. But after a while his first wife, a white woman, found her out and made him let her go.

Miller asked White Cow Bull, "Was this boy still with her here?" and White Cow Bull answered:

Yes, I saw him often around the Shahiyela camp. He was named Yellow Bird and he had light streaks in his hair. He was always with his mother in the daytime, so I would have to wait until night to try to talk to her alone. She knew I wanted to walk with her under a courting blanket and make her my wife. But she would only talk with me through the tepee cover and never came outside.
