= George Armstrong Custer =

United States cavalry commander (1839–1876)

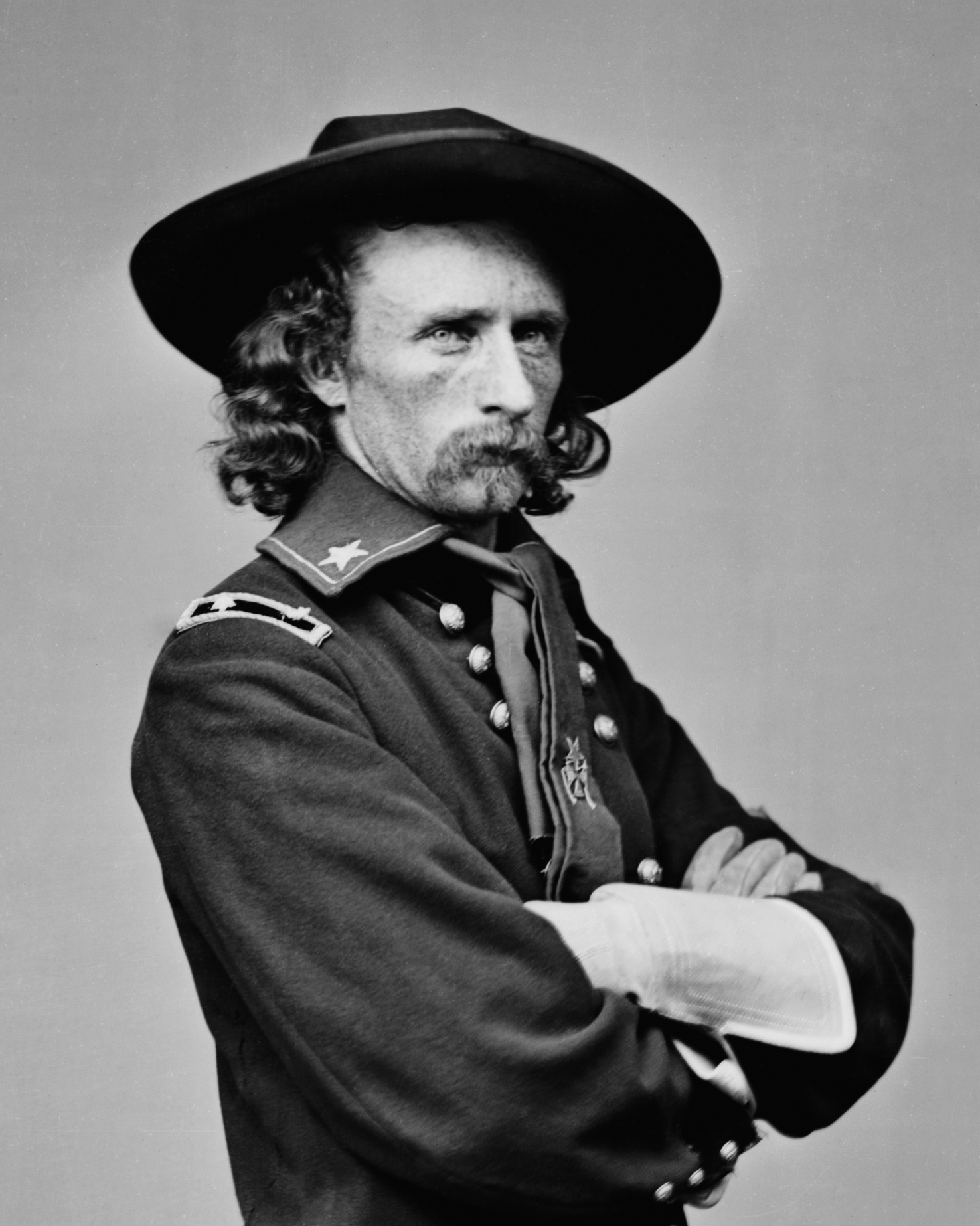
- Custer in 1865
- Born: December 5, 1839; New Rumley, Ohio, U.S.
- Died: June 25, 1876 (aged 36); Little Bighorn, Montana Territory, U.S.
- Burial place: Initially on the Little Bighorn battlefield; later reinterred in West Point Cemetery (West Point, New York)
- Education: United States Military Academy
- Spouse(s): Elizabeth ("Libbie") Bacon Custer (1842–1933) (m.1864)
- Relatives: Thomas Custer, brother Boston Custer, brother James Calhoun, brother-in-law Frederick Van Nuys, cousin
- Military career
- Allegiance: United States; Union
- Branch: United States Army; Union Army
- Service years: 1861–1876
- Rank: Lieutenant Colonel, U.S.A. Major General, U.S.V.
- Commands: Michigan Cavalry Brigade; 3rd Cavalry Division; 2nd Cavalry Division; 7th Cavalry Regiment
- Conflicts: See battles: American Civil War (1861–1865); Manassas campaign; First Battle of Bull Run; Peninsula Campaign; Maryland campaign; Battle of Antietam; Battle of Chancellorsville; Gettysburg campaign; Battle of Gettysburg; Battle of Wapping Heights; Overland campaign; Battle of the Wilderness; Battle of Yellow Tavern; Battle of Trevilian Station; Valley campaigns of 1864; Battle of Guard Hill; Third Battle of Winchester; Battle of Cedar Creek; Battle of Tom's Brook; Siege of Petersburg; Appomattox campaign; American Indian Wars; Comanche campaign; Battle of Washita River; Great Sioux War of 1876; Battle of the Little Bighorn †
- Awards: See below

George Armstrong Custer (December 5, 1839 – June 25, 1876) was a United States Army officer and cavalry commander in the American Civil War and the American Indian Wars.

Custer graduated in 1861 from the United States Military Academy at West Point, New York, last in his class. Custer's initial class had consisted of 108 candidates of whom 68 men passed the entrance exam. However, following the start of the American Civil War, many of Custer's classmates departed the academy in a series of resignations to fight for their respective states. By his graduation date, Custer ranked 34th among 34 remaining classmates. Nonetheless, Custer achieved a higher military rank than any other U.S. Army officer in his class. Following graduation, he worked closely with future Union Army Generals George B. McClellan and Alfred Pleasonton, both of whom recognized his abilities as a cavalry leader. He was promoted in the early American Civil War (1861–1865) to brevet brigadier general of volunteers at the age of 23. Only a few days afterwards, he fought at the pivotal Battle of Gettysburg in Pennsylvania in early July 1863, where he commanded the Michigan Brigade. Despite being outnumbered, the new General Custer defeated Confederate States Army cavalry of General J. E. B. Stuart's attack at East Cavalry Field on the crucial third day of the Gettysburg clash.

In 1864, Custer served in the Overland Campaign and with Union cavalry commander General Philip Sheridan's army in the Shenandoah Valley campaigns later that summer, defeating Confederate General Jubal Early at Cedar Creek. In the last year of the war of 1865, Custer destroyed or captured the remainder of Early's forces at the Battle of Waynesboro in Western Virginia. Custer's division blocked the Southern Army of Northern Virginia's final retreat from their fallen capital city of Richmond in early April 1865, and Custer received the first flag of truce from the exhausted Confederates. He was present at the Army of Northern Virginia commanding General Robert E. Lee's surrender ceremony at the McLean House to Union Army General-in-Chief Ulysses S. Grant at Appomattox Court House, Virginia. After the war, Custer was commissioned as a lieutenant colonel in the standing Regular Army and sent west to fight in the ongoing Indian Wars, mainly against the Lakota/Sioux and other Great Plains native peoples. On June 25, 1876, while leading the Army's 7th Cavalry Regiment at the Battle of the Little Bighorn in the southeastern Montana Territory against a coalition of Western Native American tribes, he was killed along with every soldier of the five companies of his regiment that he led. This event became known as "Custer's Last Stand".

Custer's dramatic end was as controversial as the rest of his life and career, and the reaction to his life remains divided, even 150 years later. His mythologized status in American history was partly established through the energetic lobbying of his adoring wife Elizabeth Bacon "Libbie" Custer (1842–1933) throughout her long widowhood that spanned six decades, well into the 20th century.

== Family and ancestry ==
Custer's paternal ancestors, Paulus and Gertrude Küster, came to the North American English colonies around 1693 from the Rhineland in Germany, probably among thousands of Palatines whose passage was arranged by the English government to gain settlers in New York and Pennsylvania.

Custer's maternal ancestors were of English and Ulster Scots descent, having ancestries from England and Northern Ireland.

According to family letters, Custer was named after George Armstrong, a minister, in his devout mother's hope that her son might join the clergy.

== Birth, siblings, and childhood ==
Custer was born in New Rumley, Ohio, to Emanuel Henry Custer (1806–1892), a farmer and blacksmith, and his second wife, Marie Ward Kirkpatrick (1807–1882), who was of English and Scots-Irish descent. He had two younger brothers, Thomas and Boston. His other full siblings were the family's youngest child, Margaret Custer, and Nevin Custer, who suffered from asthma and rheumatism. Custer also had three older half-siblings. Custer and his brothers acquired a life-long love of practical jokes, which they played out among the close family members.

Emanuel Custer was an outspoken Jacksonian Democrat who taught his children politics and toughness at an early age. In a February 3, 1887, letter to his son's widow Libby, Emanuel related an incident from when George Custer (known as Autie) was about four years old:

"He had to have a tooth drawn, and he was very much afraid of blood. When I took him to the doctor to have the tooth pulled, it was in the night and I told him if it bled well it would get well right away, and he must be a good soldier. When he got to the doctor he took his seat, and the pulling began. The forceps slipped off and he had to make a second trial. He pulled it out, and Autie never even scrunched. Going home, I led him by the arm. He jumped and skipped, and said 'Father you and me can whip all the Whigs in Michigan.' I thought that was saying a good deal but I did not contradict him."

== Education ==
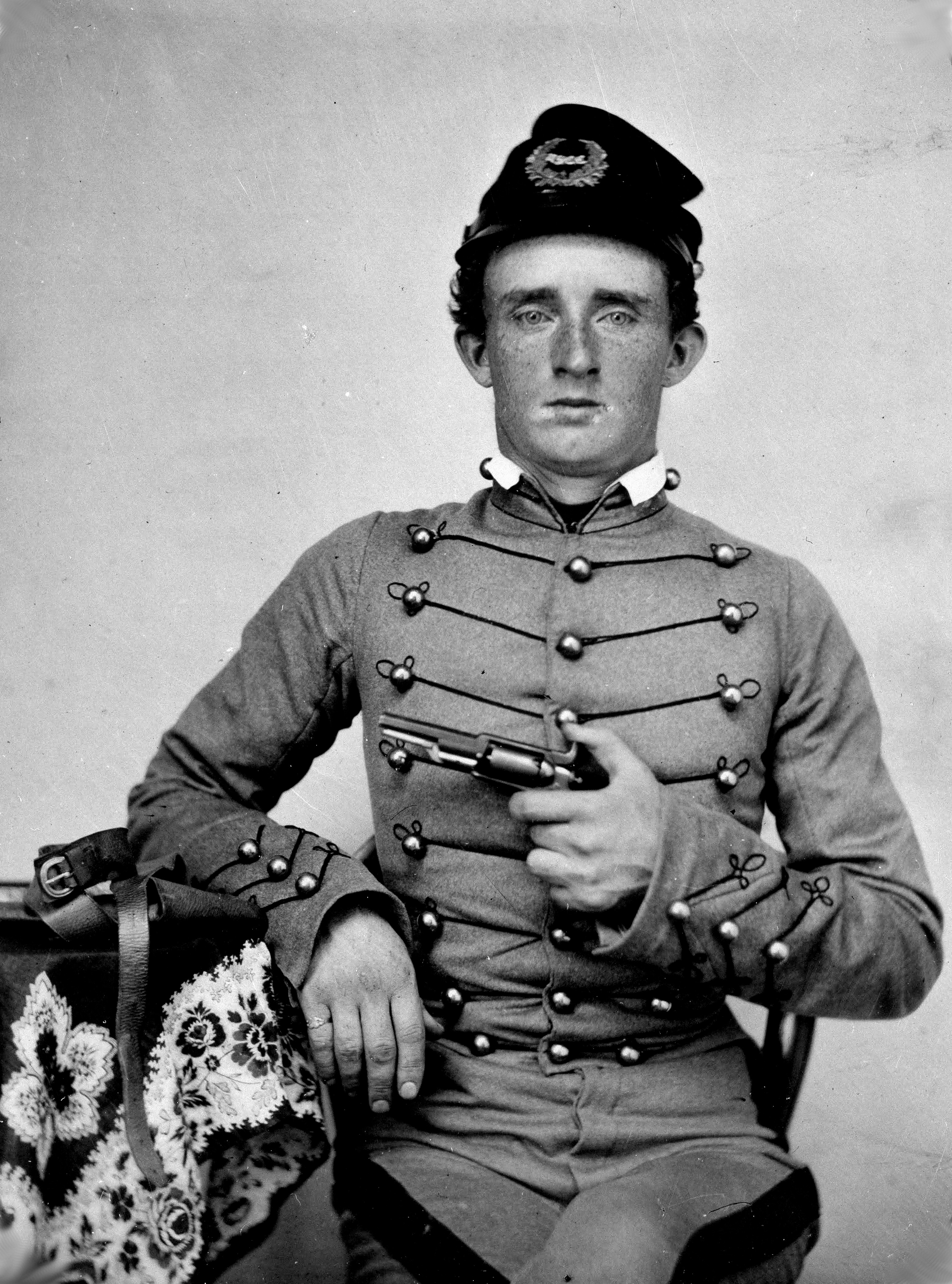
USMA Cadet George Armstrong "Autie" Custer, ca. 1859 with a Colt Model 1855 Sidehammer Pocket Revolver.

To attend school, Custer lived with an older half-sister and her husband in Monroe, Michigan. Before entering the United States Military Academy, Custer attended the McNeely Normal School, later known as Hopedale Normal College, in Hopedale, Ohio. The school was known for training teachers for elementary schools. While attending Hopedale, Custer and classmate William Enos Emery were known to have carried coal to help pay for their room and board. After graduating from McNeely Normal School in 1856, Custer taught school in Cadiz, Ohio. His first sweetheart was Mary Jane Holland.

Custer entered West Point as a cadet on July 1, 1857, as a member of the class of 1862. His class numbered seventy-nine cadets embarking on a five-year course of study. With the outbreak of the American Civil War in 1861, the course was shortened to four years, and Custer and his class graduated on June 24, 1861. He was 34th in a class of 34 graduates: 23 classmates had dropped out for academic reasons while 22 classmates had already resigned to join the Confederacy.

Throughout his life, Custer tested boundaries and rules. In his four years at West Point, he amassed a record total of 726 demerits, one of the worst conduct records in the history of the academy. The local minister remembered Custer as "the instigator of devilish plots both during the service and in Sunday school. On the surface he appeared attentive and respectful, but underneath the mind boiled with disruptive ideas." A fellow cadet recalled Custer as declaring there were only two places in a class, the head and the foot, and since he had no desire to be the head, he aspired to be the foot. A roommate noted, "It was alright with George Custer, whether he knew his lesson or not; he simply did not allow it to trouble him."

== Civil War ==
=== McClellan and Pleasonton ===
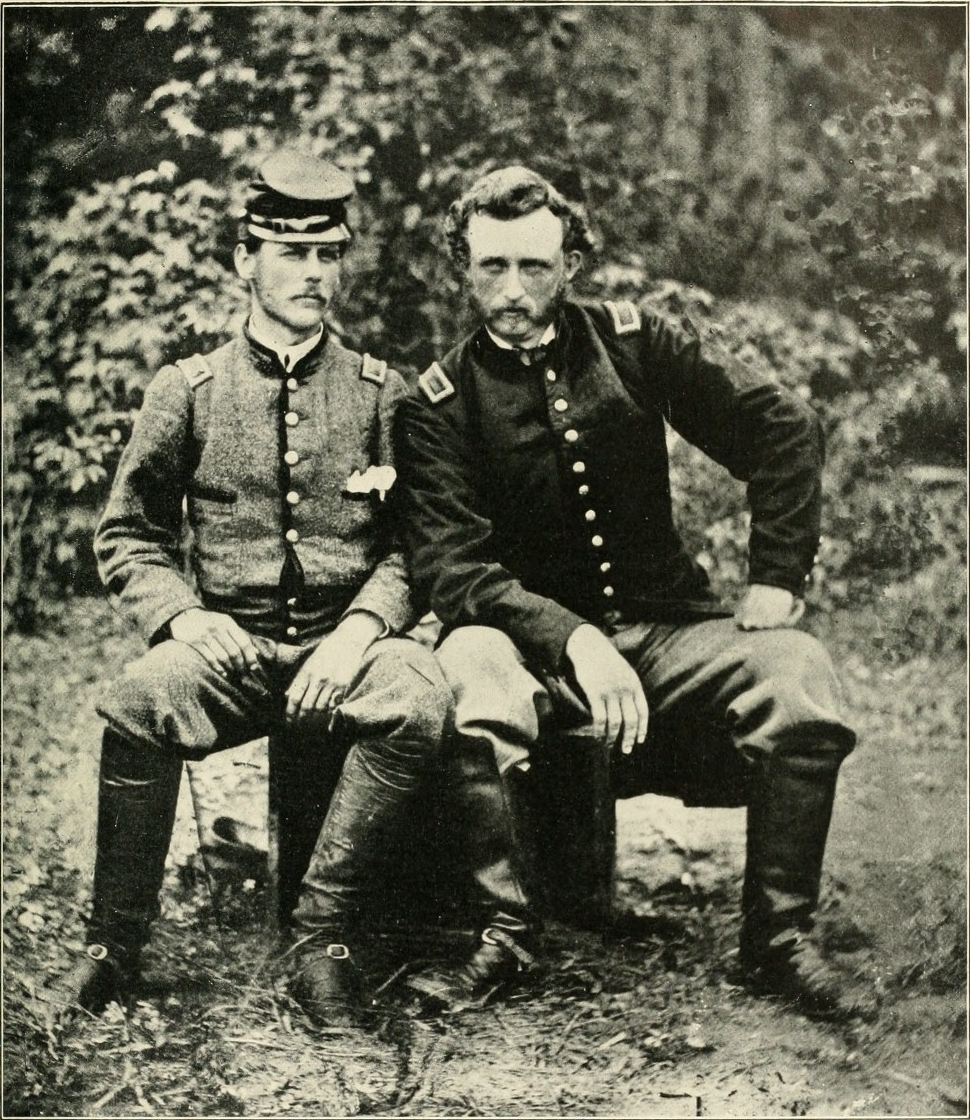
Custer with former classmate, friend, and captured Confederate soldier, Lieutenant James Barroll Washington, an aide to General Johnston, at Fair Oaks, Virginia, 1862

Like the other graduates, Custer was commissioned a second lieutenant; he was also assigned to the 2nd U.S. Cavalry Regiment and tasked with drilling volunteers in Washington, D.C. On July 21, 1861, he was with his regiment at the First Battle of Bull Run during the Manassas Campaign where Army commander Winfield Scott detailed him to carry messages to Major General Irvin McDowell. After the battle, he continued participating in the defense of Washington D.C. until October 1861, when he became ill. He was absent from his unit until February 1862. In March, he participated with the 2nd Cavalry in the Peninsula Campaign in Virginia until April 4.

On April 5, Custer served in the 5th Cavalry Regiment which participated in the Siege of Yorktown from April 5 to May 4 and was aide to Major General George B. McClellan. McClellan was in command of the Army of the Potomac during the Peninsula Campaign. On May 24, 1862, during pursuit of Confederate General Joseph E. Johnston up the Peninsula, General McClellan and his staff were reconnoitering a potential crossing point on the Chickahominy River, they stopped, and Custer overheard General John G. Barnard mutter, "I wish I knew how deep it is." Custer dashed forward on his horse out to the middle of the river, turned to the astonished officers, and shouted triumphantly, "McClellan, that's how deep it is, General!"

Custer was assigned to lead an attack with four companies of the 4th Michigan Infantry across the Chickahominy River above New Bridge. The attack was successful, resulting in the capture of 50 Confederate soldiers and the seizing of the first Confederate battle flag of the war. McClellan termed it a "very gallant affair" and congratulated Custer personally. In his role as aide-de-camp to McClellan, he began his life-long pursuit of publicity. He was promoted to the rank of captain on June 5, 1862. On July 17, he was demoted to the rank of First Lieutenant. He participated in the Maryland Campaign in September to October, the Battle of South Mountain on September 14, the Battle of Antietam on September 17, and the March to Warrenton, Virginia, in October.

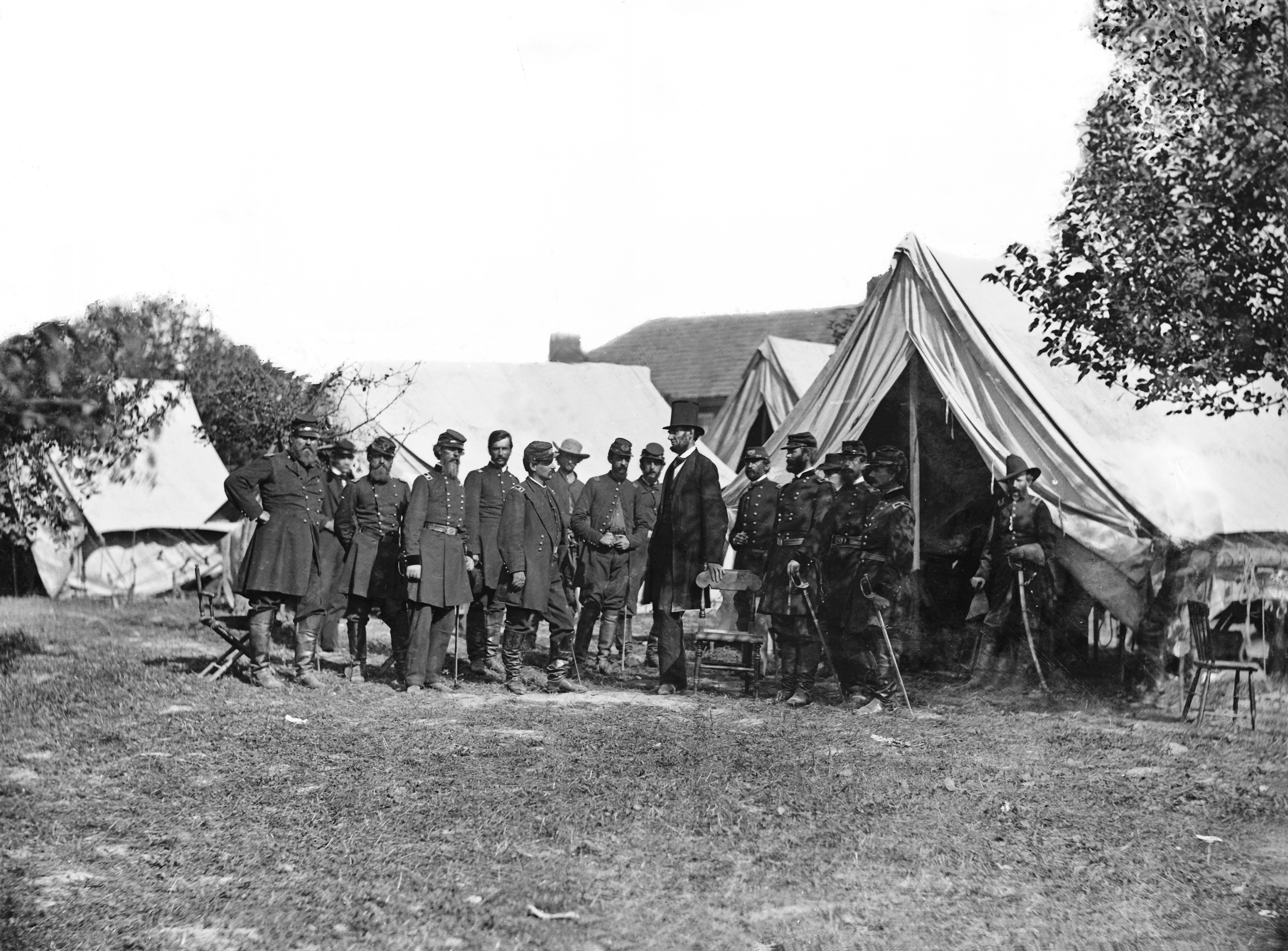
Custer (extreme right) with President Lincoln, General McClellan and other officers after the Battle of Antietam, 1862

On June 9, 1863, he became aide to Brevet Lieutenant Colonel Alfred Pleasonton, who was commanding the Cavalry Corps, Army of the Potomac. Recalling his service under Pleasonton, he was quoted as saying that "I do not believe a father could love his son more than General Pleasonton loves me." Pleasonton's first assignment was to locate the army of Robert E. Lee, moving north through the Shenandoah Valley in the beginning of what was to become the Gettysburg campaign.

=== Brigade command ===
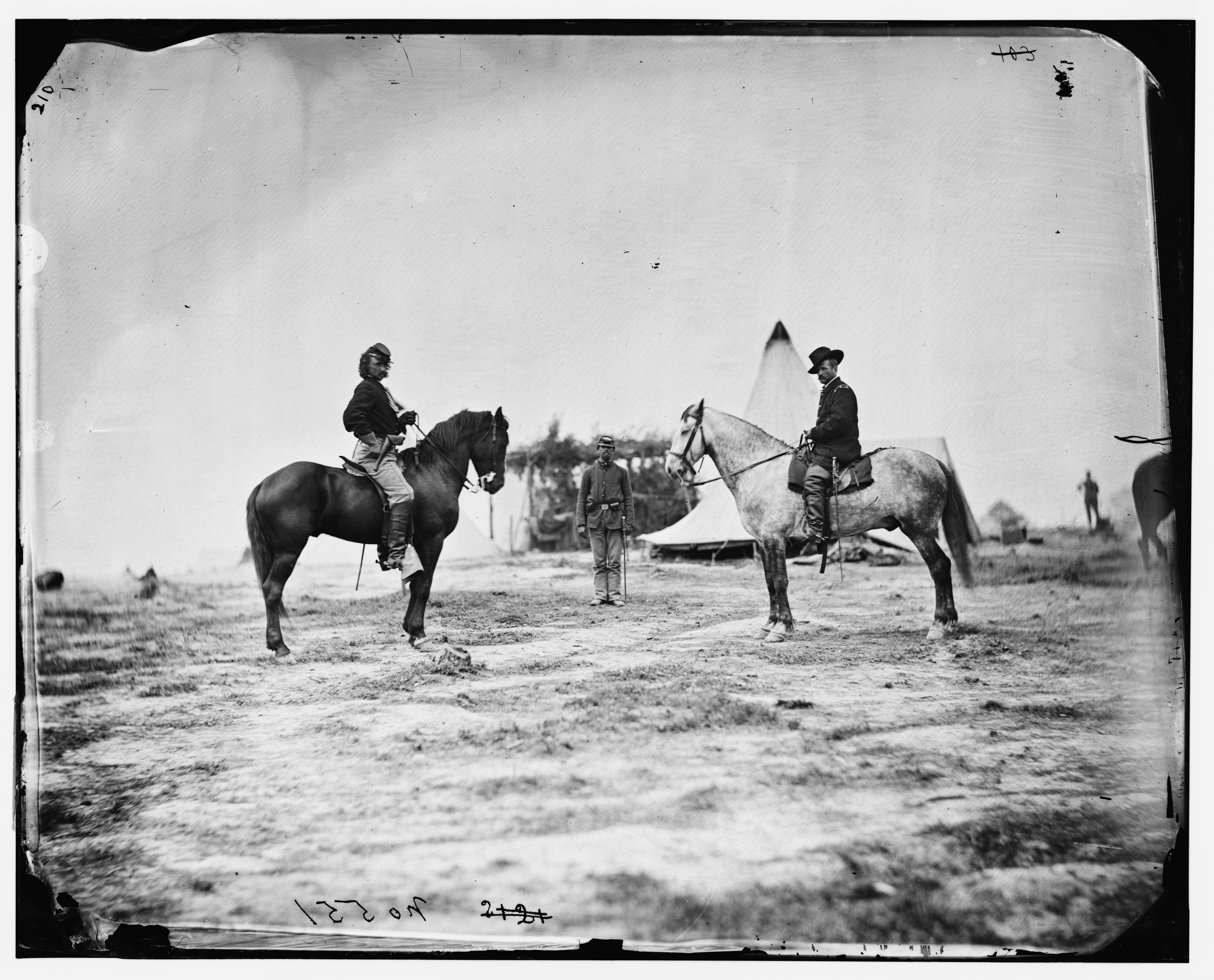
Custer (left) with General Pleasonton on horseback in Falmouth, Virginia, 1863

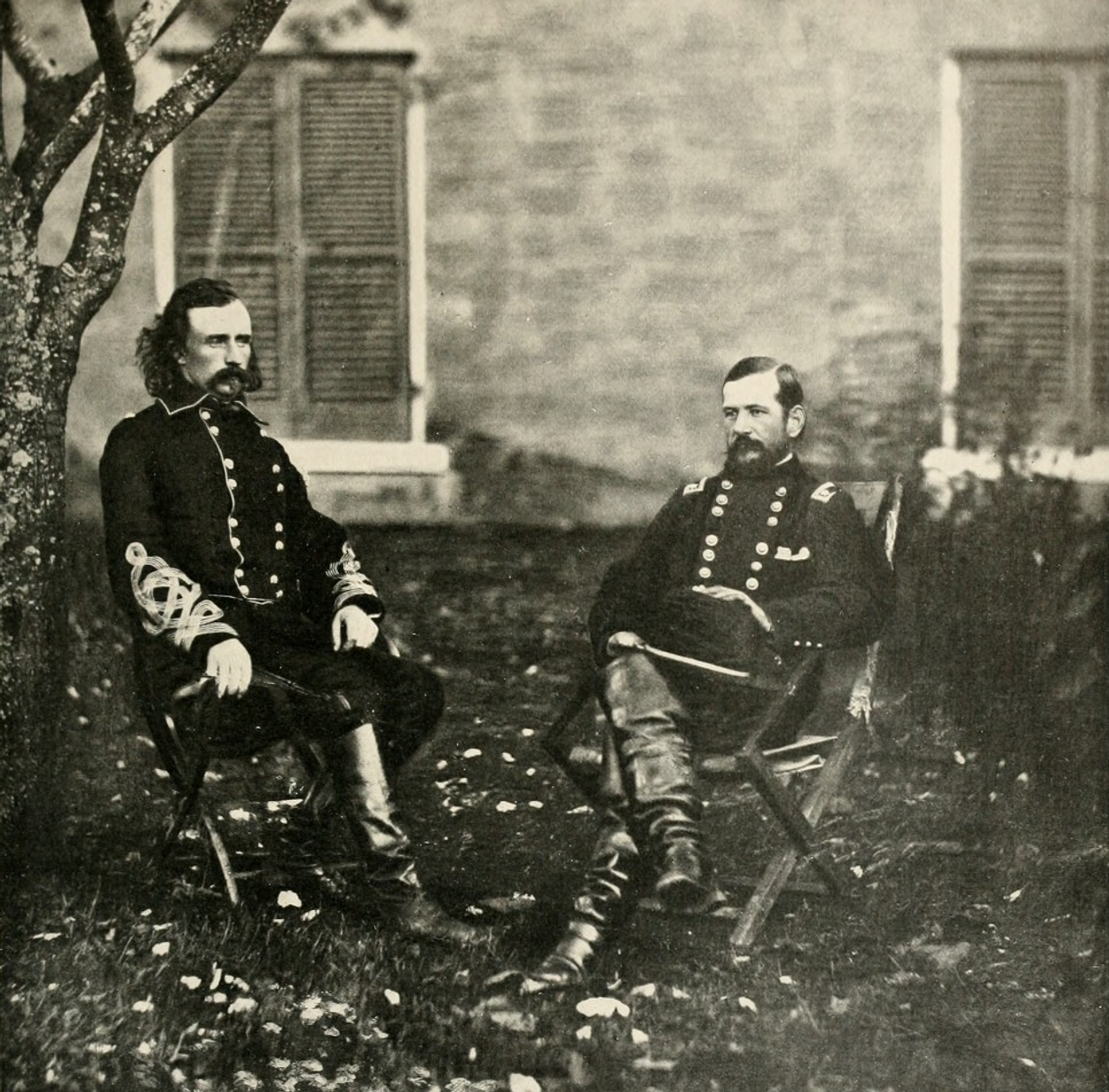
Custer (left) with Alfred Pleasonton in autumn 1863

Pleasonton was promoted on June 22, 1863, to major general of U.S. Volunteers. On June 29, after consulting with the new commander of the Army of the Potomac, George Meade, Pleasonton began replacing political generals with "commanders who were prepared to fight, to personally lead mounted attacks". He found just the kind of aggressive fighters he wanted in three of his aides: Wesley Merritt, Elon J. Farnsworth (both of whom had command experience), and Custer. All received immediate promotions, Custer to brigadier general of volunteers, commanding the Michigan Cavalry Brigade ("Wolverines"), part of the division of Brigadier General Judson Kilpatrick. Despite having no direct command experience, he became one of the youngest generals in the Union Army at the age of 23. He immediately shaped his brigade to reflect his aggressive character.

Now a general officer, he had greater latitude in choosing his uniform. Though often criticized as being gaudy, it was more than personal vanity. Historian Tom Carhart observed that "A showy uniform for Custer was one of command presence on the battlefield: he wanted to be readily distinguishable at first glance from all other soldiers. He intended to lead from the front, and to him it was a crucial issue of unit morale that his men be able to look up in the middle of a charge, or at any other time on the battlefield, and instantly see him leading the way into danger."

=== Hanover and Abbottstown ===
On June 30, 1863, Custer and the First and Seventh Michigan Cavalry had just passed through Hanover, Pennsylvania, while the Fifth and Sixth Michigan Cavalry followed about seven miles behind. Hearing gunfire, he turned and started off to the sound of the guns. A courier reported that Farnsworth's Brigade had been attacked by rebel cavalry from side streets in the town. Reassembling his command, he received orders from Kilpatrick to engage the enemy northeast of town near the railway station. Custer deployed his troops and began to advance. After a brief firefight, the rebels withdrew to the northeast. This seemed odd, since it was assumed that Lee and his army were somewhere to the west. Though seemingly of little consequence, this skirmish further delayed Stuart from joining Lee. As Captain James H. Kidd, commander of F troop, Sixth Michigan Cavalry, later wrote: "Under [Custer's] skillful hand the four regiments were soon welded into a cohesive unit...."

Next morning, July 1, they passed through Abbottstown, Pennsylvania, still searching for Stuart's cavalry. Late in the morning they heard sounds of gunfire from the direction of Gettysburg. That night at Heidlersburg, Pennsylvania, they learned that General John Buford's cavalry had found Lee's army at Gettysburg. The next morning, July 2, orders came for Custer to hurry north to disrupt General Richard S. Ewell's communications and relieve the pressure on the Union forces. By midafternoon, as they approached Hunterstown, Pennsylvania, they encountered Stuart's cavalry. Custer rode ahead alone to investigate and found that the rebels were unaware of the arrival of his troops.

Returning to his men, he carefully positioned them along both sides of the road where they would be hidden from the rebels. Further along the road, behind a low rise, he positioned the First and Fifth Michigan Cavalry and his artillery, under the command of Lieutenant Alexander Cummings McWhorter Pennington Jr. To bait his trap, he gathered A Troop, Sixth Michigan Cavalry, and called out, "Come on boys, I'll lead you this time!" and galloped directly at the unsuspecting rebels. As he had expected, the rebels, "more than two hundred horsemen, came racing down the country road" after Custer and his men.

He lost half of his men in the deadly rebel fire and his horse went down, leaving him on foot. He was rescued by Private Norvell Francis Churchill of the 1st Michigan Cavalry, who galloped up, shot Custer's nearest assailant, and pulled Custer up behind him. Custer and his remaining men reached safety, while the pursuing rebels were cut down by slashing rifle fire, then canister from six cannons. The rebels broke off their attack, and both sides withdrew.

Spending most of the night in the saddle, Custer's brigade arrived at Two Taverns, Pennsylvania, roughly five miles southeast of Gettysburg around 3:00 a.m. on July 3. There he was joined by Farnsworth's brigade. By daybreak they received orders to protect Meade's flanks. At this point, he was about to experience perhaps his finest hours during the war.

=== Gettysburg ===
Robert E. Lee's battle plan, shared with only a small number of his subordinates, was to defeat George Meade through a combined assault using all of his resources. General James Longstreet would attack Cemetery Hill from the west, J.E.B. Stuart's cavalry would attack Culp's Hill from the southeast, and Richard S. Ewell would attack Culp's Hill from the north. Once the Union forces holding Culp's Hill had collapsed, the rebels would roll up the remaining Union defenses on Cemetery Ridge. To accomplish this, Lee sent Stuart with six thousand cavalrymen and mounted infantry on a long flanking maneuver.

By mid-morning on July 3, Custer had arrived at the intersection of Old Dutch Road and Hanover Road, two miles east of Gettysburg. He was later joined by Brigadier General David McMurtrie Gregg, who ordered Custer to deploy his men at the northeast corner. Custer then sent out scouts to investigate nearby wooded areas. Meanwhile, Gregg had positioned Colonel John Baillie McIntosh's brigade near the intersection and sent the rest of his command to do picket duty two miles to the southwest. After additional deployments, 2,400 cavalry under McIntosh and 1,200 under Custer remained together with Colonel Alexander Cummings McWhorter Pennington Jr.'s and Captain Alanson Merwin Randol's artillery, who had a total of ten three-inch guns.

About noon, Custer's men heard cannon fire, Stuart's signal to Lee that he was in position and had not been detected. About the same time, Gregg received a message warning that a large body of rebel cavalry had moved out on the York Pike and might be trying to get around the Union right. A second message from Pleasonton ordered Gregg to send Custer to cover the Union far left. Since Gregg had already sent most of his force off to do other duties, it was clear to both Gregg and Custer that Custer must remain. Custer's brigade had about 2,700 men facing 6,000 Confederates.

Soon afterward, fighting broke out between the skirmish lines. Stuart ordered an attack by his mounted infantry under General Albert G. Jenkins, but the Union line held, with men from the First Michigan cavalry, the First New Jersey Cavalry, and the Third Pennsylvania Cavalry. Stuart ordered Jackson's four gun battery into action; Custer ordered Pennington to answer. After a brief exchange in which two of Jackson's guns were destroyed, there was a lull in the action.

About one o'clock, the massive Confederate artillery barrage began in support of the upcoming assault on Cemetery Ridge. Jenkins's men renewed the attack but soon ran out of ammunition and fell back. Resupplied, they again pressed the attack. Outnumbered, the Union cavalry fell back, firing as they went. Custer sent most of his Fifth Michigan cavalry ahead on foot, forcing Jenkins's men to fall back. Jenkins's men were reinforced by about 150 sharpshooters from General Fitzhugh Lee's brigade, and shortly after Stuart ordered a mounted charge by the Ninth Virginia Cavalry and the Thirteenth Virginia Cavalry. Now it was Custer's men who were running out of ammunition. The Fifth Michigan was forced back and combat was reduced to vicious, hand-to-hand combat.

Seeing this, Custer mounted a counterattack. Riding ahead of the fewer than 400 new troopers of the Seventh Michigan Cavalry, he shouted, "Come on, you Wolverines!" As he swept forward, he formed a line of squadrons five ranks deep – five rows of eighty horsemen side by side – chasing the retreating rebels until their charge was stopped by a wood rail fence. The horses and men became jammed into a solid mass and were soon attacked on their left flank by the dismounted Ninth and Thirteenth Virginia Cavalry and on the right flank by the mounted First Virginia Cavalry. Custer extricated his men and raced south to the protection of Pennington's artillery near Hanover Road. The pursuing Confederates were cut down by canister, then driven back by the remounted Fifth Michigan Cavalry. Both forces withdrew to a safe distance to regroup.

It was then about three o'clock. The artillery barrage to the west had suddenly stopped. Union soldiers were surprised to see Stuart's entire force about a half-mile away coming toward them, not in line of battle, but "formed in close column of squadrons... A grander spectacle than their advance has rarely been beheld". Stuart recognized he now had little time to reach and attack the Union rear along Cemetery Ridge; he must make one last effort to break through the Union cavalry.

Stuart passed by McIntosh's cavalry – the First New Jersey, Third Pennsylvania, and Company A of Purnell's Legion, which had been posted about halfway down the field – with relative ease. As Stuart approached, the Union troops were ordered back into the woods without slowing down Stuart's column, which was "advancing as if in review, with sabers drawn and glistening like silver in the bright sunlight...."

Stuart's last obstacle was Custer and his 400 veteran troopers of the First Michigan Cavalry directly in the Confederate cavalry's path. Outnumbered but undaunted, Custer rode to the head of the regiment, "drew his saber, threw off his hat so they could see his long yellow hair" and shouted... "Come on, you Wolverines!" Custer formed his men in line of battle and charged. Historian William E. Miller observed that "So sudden was the collision that many of the horses were turned end over end and crushed their riders beneath them...."

As the Confederate advance was stopped, its right flank was struck by troopers of the Fifth, Sixth, and Seventh Michigan. McIntosh was able to gather some of his men from the First New Jersey and Third Pennsylvania and charged the rebel left flank. "Seeing that the situation was becoming critical, I [Captain Miller] turned to [Lieutenant Brooke Rawle] and said: 'I have been ordered to hold this position, but, if you will back me up in case I am court-martialed for disobedience, I will order a charge.'" The rebel column disintegrated, and individual troopers fought with saber and pistol.

Within twenty minutes the combatants heard the sound of the Union artillery opening up on Pickett's men. Stuart knew that whatever chance he had of joining the Confederate assault was gone. He withdrew his men to Cress Ridge.

Custer's brigade lost 257 men at Gettysburg, the highest loss of any Union cavalry brigade. "I challenge the annals of warfare to produce a more brilliant or successful charge of cavalry", Custer wrote in his report. "For Gallant And Meritorious Services", he was awarded a Regular Army brevet promotion to major.

=== Shenandoah Valley ===
General Custer also participated in Sheridan's campaign in the Shenandoah Valley. In this campaign, the civilian population was specifically targeted in what is known as the Burning.

In 1864, with the Cavalry Corps of the Army of the Potomac reorganized under the command of Major General Philip Sheridan, Custer (now commanding the 3rd Division) led his "Wolverines" to the Shenandoah Valley where by the year's end they defeated the army of Confederate Lieutenant General Jubal Early in the Valley Campaigns of 1864. During May and June, Sheridan and Custer (captain, 5th Cavalry, May 8 and brevet lieutenant colonel, May 11) took part in cavalry actions supporting the Overland Campaign, including the Battle of the Wilderness, after which Custer ascended to division commander and the Battle of Yellow Tavern, where J.E.B. Stuart was mortally wounded.

In the largest all-cavalry engagement of the war, the Battle of Trevilian Station, in which Sheridan sought to destroy the Virginia Central Railroad and the Confederates' western resupply route, Custer captured Hampton's divisional train but was then cut off and suffered heavy losses (including having his division's trains overrun and his personal baggage captured by the enemy) before being relieved. When Lieutenant General Early was ordered to move down the Shenandoah Valley and threaten Washington, D.C., Custer's division was again dispatched under Sheridan. In the Valley Campaigns of 1864, the Union troops engaged the Confederates at the Third Battle of Winchester and effectively destroyed Early's army during Sheridan's counterattack at Cedar Creek.

On the same day as the Battle of Cedar Creek on October 19, 1864, Custer was given the brevet award of major general in the U.S. Volunteers for his actions at Third Winchester and Fisher's Hill in September and was mustered in at that rank since he was commanding a division. Custer could now wear the rank of major general and receive major general's pay (brevet awards were not promotions unless that person was mustered in at that new rank). Custer received the brevet award of major general in the U.S. Army in March 1865 and was promoted to the full rank of major general in the U.S. Volunteers in April 1865.

Having defeated Early, Sheridan and Custer returned to the main Union Army lines at the Siege of Petersburg, where they spent the winter.

=== Appomattox Court House ===
In April 1865, the Confederate lines finally broke and Robert E. Lee began his retreat to Appomattox Court House, pursued by the Union cavalry. Custer distinguished himself by his actions at Waynesboro, Dinwiddie Court House, and Five Forks. His division blocked Lee's retreat on its final day and received the first flag of truce from the Confederate force.

After a truce was arranged, Custer was escorted through the lines to meet Longstreet, who described Custer as having flaxen locks flowing over his shoulders, and Custer said "in the name of General Sheridan I demand the unconditional surrender of this army." Longstreet replied that he was not in command of the army, but if he was, he would not deal with messages from Sheridan. Custer responded that it would be a pity to have more blood shed upon the field, to which Longstreet suggested the truce be respected and then added "General Lee has gone to meet General Grant, and it is for them to determine the future of the armies."

Custer was present at the surrender at Appomattox Court House, and the table upon which the surrender was signed was presented to him as a gift for his wife by Sheridan, who included a note praising Custer's gallantry. Libbie Custer treasured the gift of the historic table, which is now in the Smithsonian Institution. On April 15, 1865, Custer was promoted to major general in the U.S. Volunteers, making him the youngest major general in the Union Army at age 25. Custer's promotion to the full rank of major general was the most significant achievement in his young career.

On April 25, after the war officially ended, Custer had his men search for and illegally seize a large prize racehorse named "Don Juan" near Clarksville, Virginia, worth an estimated $10,000 (several hundred thousand dollars today), along with his written pedigree. Custer rode Don Juan in the grand review victory parade in Washington, D.C., on May 23, creating a sensation when the scared thoroughbred bolted. Owner Richard Gaines wrote to General Grant, who ordered Custer to return the horse to Gaines, but Custer did not do so. Instead, he hid the horse and won a race with it the next year before the horse suddenly died.

== Reconstruction duties in Texas ==
On June 3, 1865, at Sheridan's behest, Major General Custer accepted command of the 2nd Division of Cavalry, Military Division of the Southwest, to march from Alexandria, Louisiana, to Hempstead, Texas, as part of the Union occupation forces. Custer arrived at Alexandria on June 27 and began assembling his units, which took more than a month to gather and remount. On July 17, he assumed command of the Cavalry Division of the Military Division of the Gulf (on August 5, officially named the 2nd Division of Cavalry of the Military Division of the Gulf), and accompanied by his wife, he led the division (five regiments of veteran Western Theater cavalrymen) to Texas on an arduous 18-day march in August. On October 27, the division departed to Austin. On October 29, Custer moved the division from Hempstead to Austin, arriving on November 4. Major General Custer became Chief of Cavalry of the Department of Texas, from November 13 to February 1, 1866, succeeding Major General Wesley Merritt.

During his entire period of command of the division, Custer encountered considerable friction and near mutiny from the volunteer cavalry regiments who had campaigned along the Gulf coast. They desired to be mustered out of Federal service rather than continue campaigning. They resented the imposition of discipline (particularly from an Eastern Theater general) and considered Custer nothing more than a vain dandy.

Custer's division was mustered out beginning in November 1865, replaced by the regulars of the U.S. 6th Cavalry Regiment. Although their occupation of Austin had apparently been pleasant, many veterans harbored deep resentments against Custer, particularly those in the 2nd Wisconsin Cavalry, because of his attempts to maintain discipline. Upon its mustering out, several members planned to ambush Custer, but he was warned the night before and the attempt thwarted.

== Post-war options ==
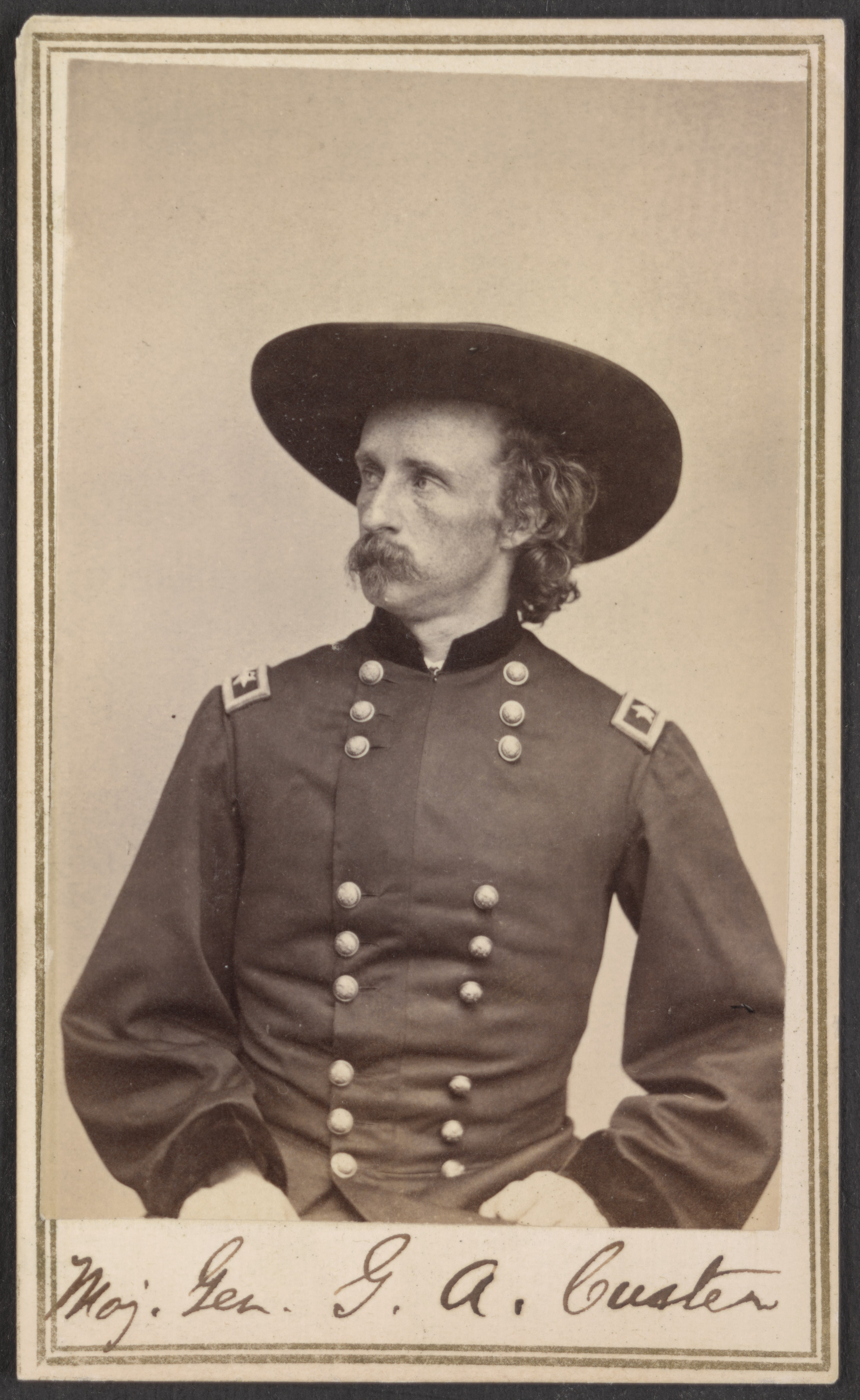
Mathew Brady photograph of Custer. From the Liljenquist Family Collection of Civil War Photographs, Prints and Photographs Division, Library of Congress

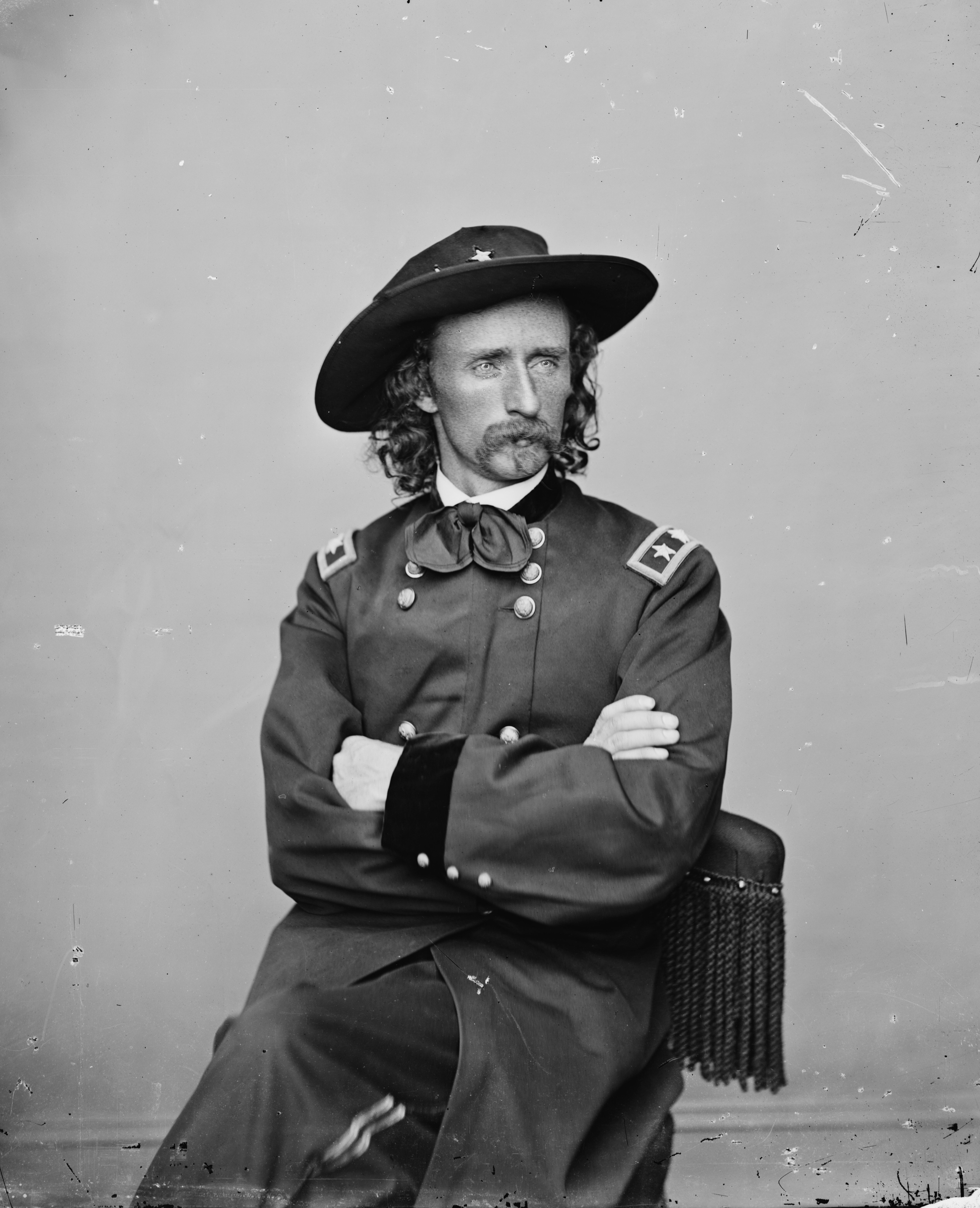
Brevet Major General George Armstrong Custer, United States Army, 1865

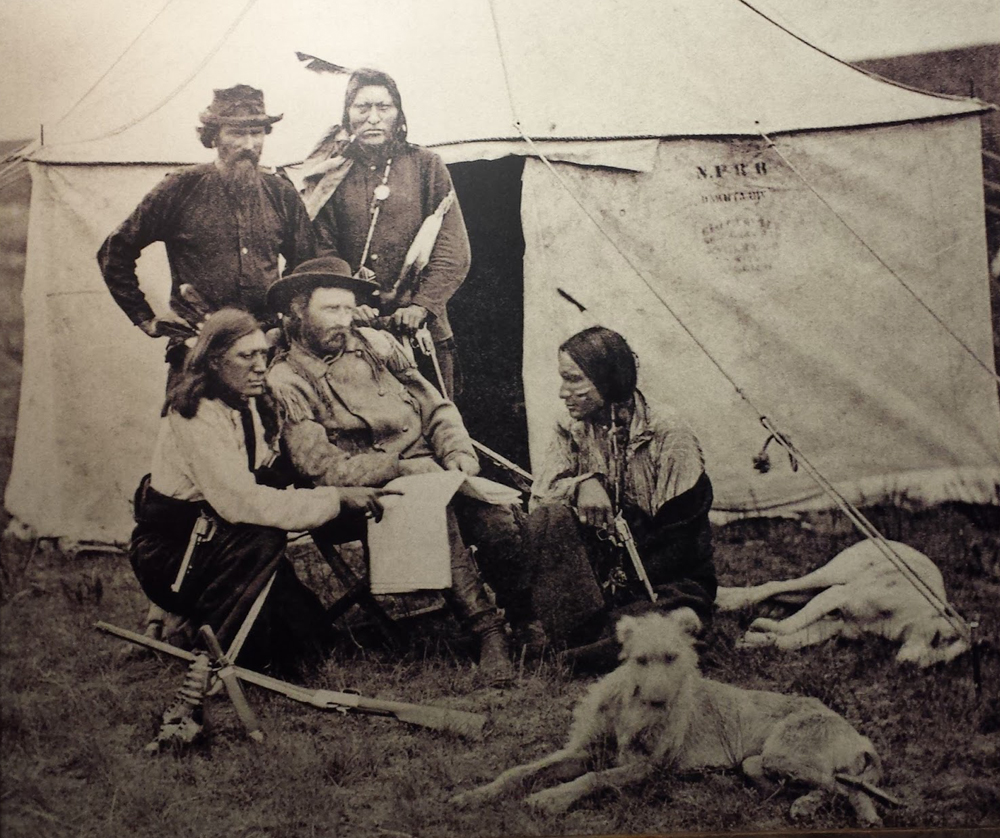
Custer and Bloody Knife (kneeling left), his favorite Indian Scout. Custer was well-liked by his native scouts, whose company he enjoyed. He often ate with them. A diary entry in May 1876 by Kellogg records, "General Custer visits scouts; much at home amongst them."

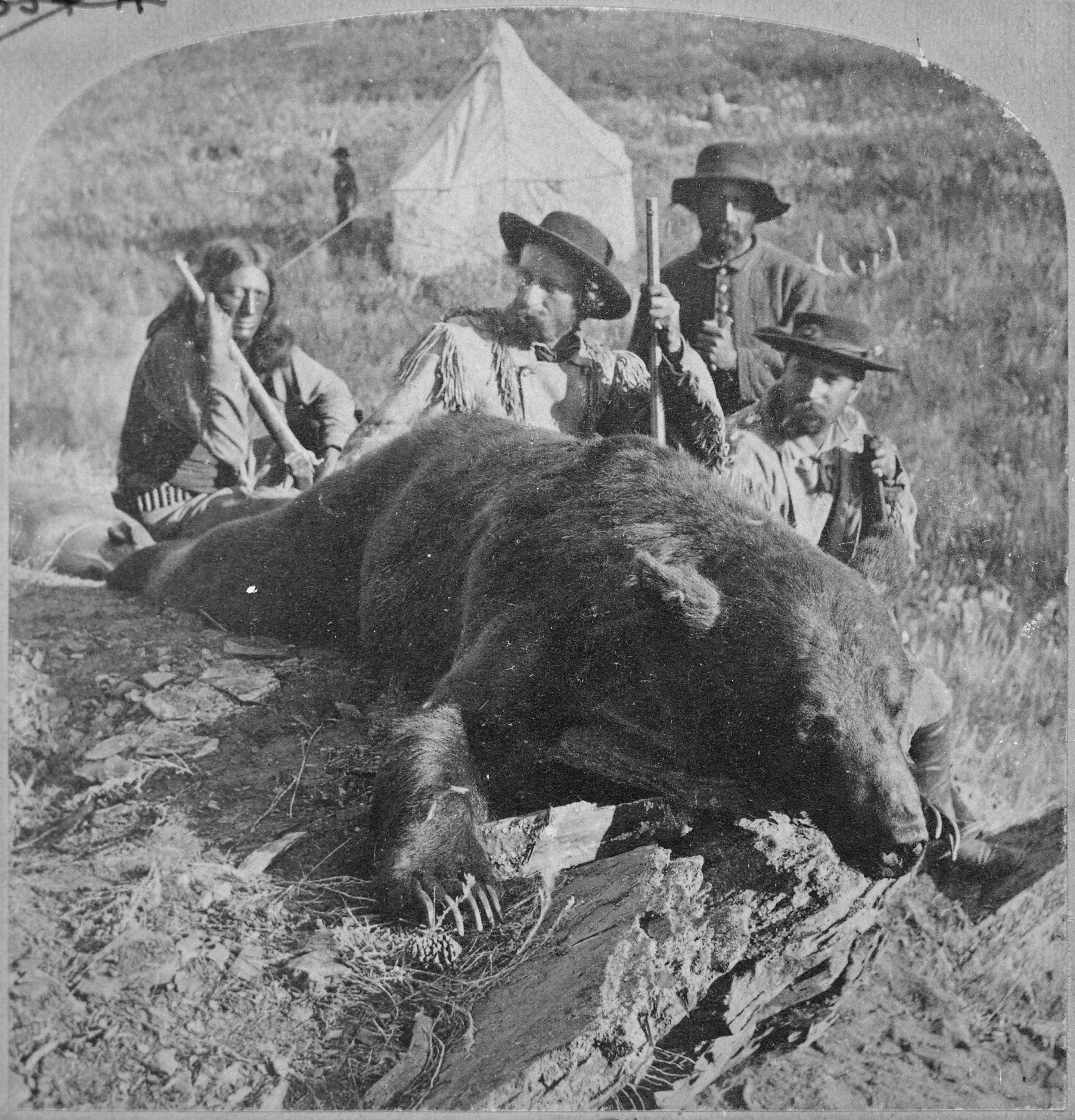
"Our First Grizzly, killed by Gen. Custer and Col. Ludlow." By Illingworth, 1874, during Black Hills Expedition (Left to right: Bloody Knife, George Armstrong Custer, Private John Noonan, and Captain William Ludlow)

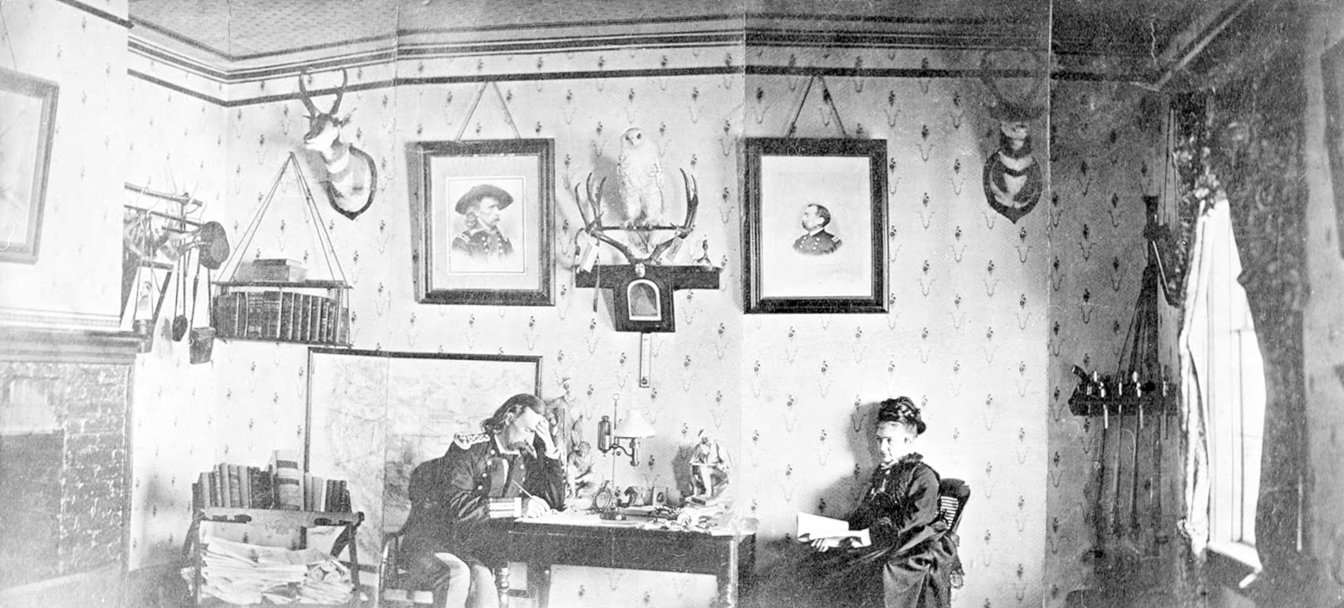
Custer and his wife at Fort Abraham Lincoln, Dakota Territory, 1874

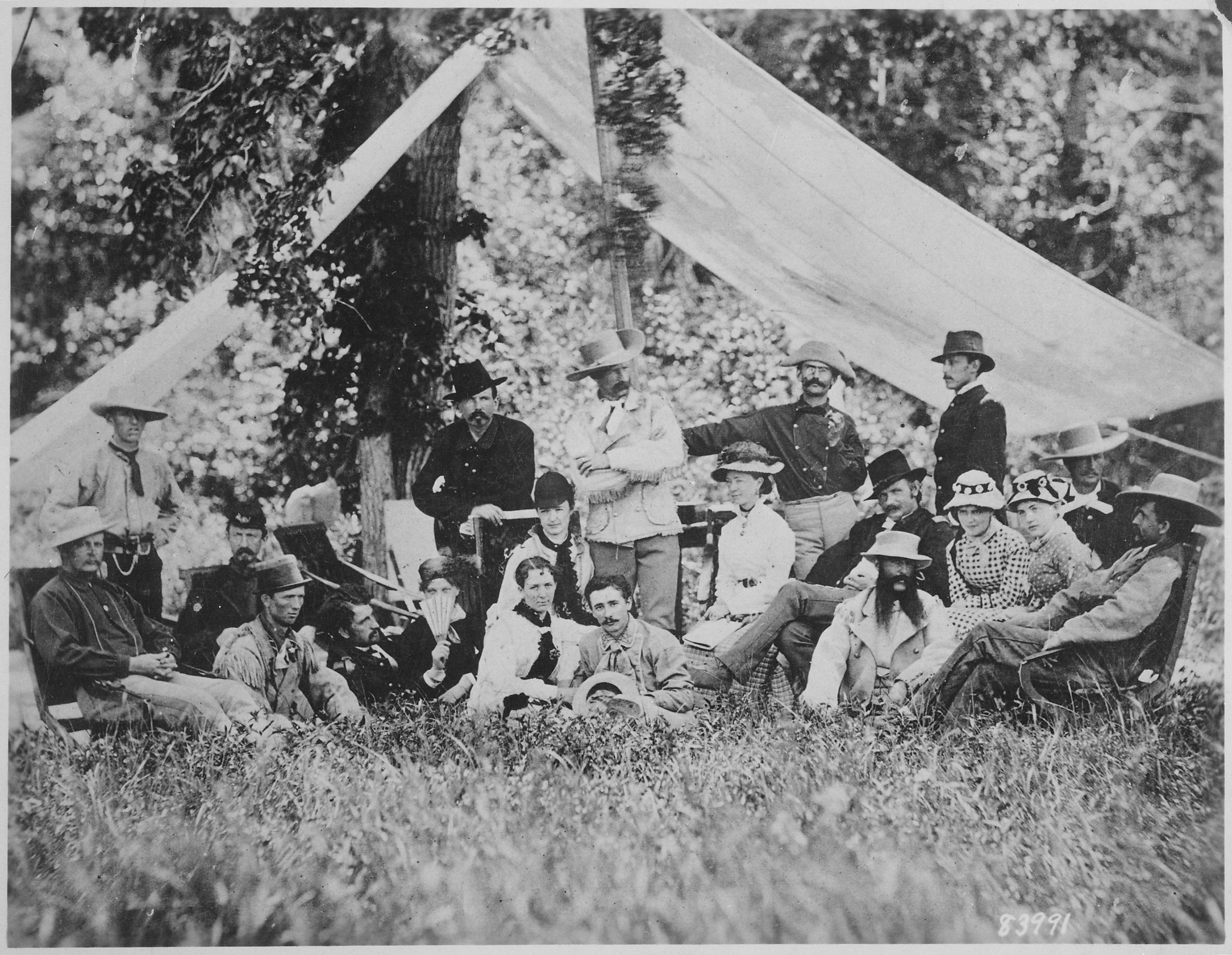
Hunting and camping party near Fort Abraham Lincoln, 1875. An illustration of the variety of uniforms worn by Cavalry Regiments in the west. From left to right: Lt. James Calhoun, Mr. Swett, Capt. Stephen Baker, Boston Custer, Lt. Winfield Scott Edgerly, Miss Watson, Capt. Myles Walter Keogh, Mrs. Maggie Calhoun, Mrs. Elizabeth Custer, Lt. Col. George Custer, Dr. H.O. Paulding, Mrs. Henrietta Smith, Dr. George Edwin Lord, Capt. Thomas Bell Weir, Lt. William Winer Cooke, Lt. R.E. Thompson, Miss; Wadsworth, another Miss Wadsworth, Capt. Thomas Custer and Lt. Algernon Emery Smith.

On February 1, 1866, Major General Custer mustered out of the U.S. volunteer service and took an extended leave of absence until September 24. During this time he explored several options in New York City, where he considered careers in railroads and mining. Offered a position (and $10,000 in gold) as adjutant general of the army of Benito Juárez of Mexico, who was then in a struggle with the Mexican Emperor Maximilian I (a satellite ruler of French Emperor Napoleon III), Custer applied for a one-year leave of absence from the U.S. Army, which was endorsed by Grant and Secretary Stanton. Sheridan and Mrs. Custer disapproved, and after his request for leave was opposed by U.S. Secretary of State William H. Seward, who was against having an American officer commanding foreign troops, Custer refused the alternative of resignation from the Army to take the lucrative post.

Following the death of his father-in-law in May 1866, Custer returned to Monroe, Michigan, where he considered running for Congress. He took part in public discussion over the treatment of the American South in the aftermath of the Civil War, advocating a policy of moderation. He was named head of the Soldiers and Sailors Union, regarded as a response to the hyper-partisan Grand Army of the Republic (GAR). Formed in 1866, it was led by Republican activist John Alexander Logan.

In September 1866, Custer accompanied President Andrew Johnson on a journey by train known as the "Swing Around the Circle" to build up public support for Johnson's policies towards the South. Custer denied a charge by the newspapers that Johnson had promised him a colonel's commission in return for his support, but Custer had written to Johnson some weeks before seeking such a commission. Custer and his wife stayed with the president during most of the trip. At one point, Custer confronted a small group of Ohio men who repeatedly jeered Johnson, saying to them: "I was born two miles and a half from here, but I am ashamed of you."

== Indian Wars ==
On July 28, 1866, Custer was appointed lieutenant colonel of the newly created 7th Cavalry Regiment, which was headquartered at Fort Riley, Kansas. He served on frontier duty at Fort Riley from October 18 to March 26, and scouted in Kansas and Colorado until July 28, 1867. He took part in Major General Winfield Scott Hancock's expedition against the Cheyenne. On June 26, Lt. Lyman Kidder's party, made up of ten troopers and one scout, were massacred while en route to Fort Wallace. Lt. Kidder was to deliver dispatches to Custer from General Sherman, but his party was attacked by Lakota Sioux and Cheyenne. Days later, Custer and a search party found the bodies of Kidder's patrol.

Following the Hancock campaign, Custer was arrested and suspended at Fort Leavenworth, Kansas, until August 12, 1868, for being absent without leave (AWOL), after having abandoned his post to see his wife. At the request of Major General Sheridan, who wanted him for his planned winter campaign against the Cheyenne, he was allowed to return to duty before his one year of suspension had expired and join his regiment on October 7, 1868. He then went on frontier duty, scouting in Kansas and Indian Territory through October 1869.

Under Sheridan's orders, he took part in establishing Camp Supply in Indian Territory in early November 1868 as a supply base for the winter campaign. On November 27, 1868, he led the 7th Cavalry Regiment in an attack on the Cheyenne encampment of Chief Black Kettle – the Battle of Washita River. He reported killing 103 warriors; 53 women and children were taken as prisoners. Estimates by the Cheyenne of their casualties were substantially lower (11 warriors plus 19 women and children). Custer had his men shoot most of the 875 Indian ponies they had captured. The Battle of Washita River was regarded as the first substantial U.S. victory in the Southern Plains War, and it helped force a large portion of the Southern Cheyenne on to a U.S.-assigned reservation.

In 1873, he was sent to the Dakota Territory to protect a railroad survey party against the Lakota. On August 4, 1873, near the Tongue River, the 7th Cavalry Regiment clashed for the first time with the Lakota. One man on each side was killed. In 1874, Custer led an expedition into the Black Hills and announced the discovery of gold on French Creek near present-day Custer, South Dakota. Custer's announcement triggered the Black Hills Gold Rush. Among the towns that immediately sprang up was Deadwood, South Dakota, notorious for its lawlessness.

== Grant, Belknap and politics ==
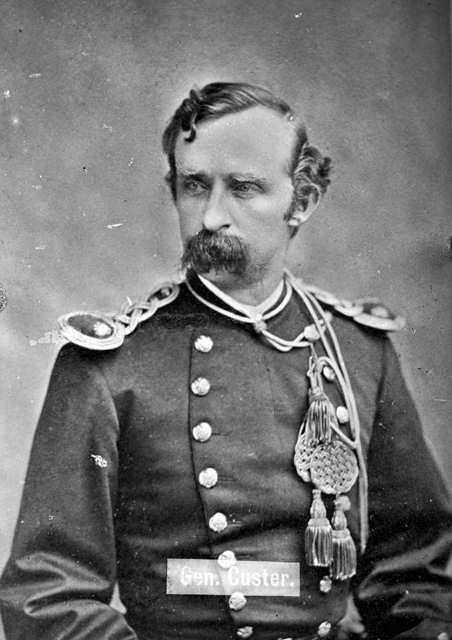
Lieutenant Colonel George A. Custer, 7th U.S. Cavalry, ca. 1875

In 1875, the Grant administration attempted to buy the Black Hills region from the Sioux. When the Sioux refused to sell, they were ordered to report to reservations by the end of January 1876. Mid-winter conditions made it impossible for them to comply. The administration labeled them "hostiles" and tasked the Army with bringing them in.

Custer was to command an expedition planned for the spring, part of a three-pronged campaign. While Custer's expedition marched west from Fort Abraham Lincoln, near present-day Mandan, North Dakota, troops under Colonel John Gibbon were to march east from Fort Ellis, near present-day Bozeman, Montana, while a force under General George Crook was to march north from Fort Fetterman, near present-day Douglas, Wyoming.

Custer's 7th Cavalry was originally scheduled to leave Fort Abraham Lincoln on April 6, 1876, but on March 15 he was summoned to Washington to testify at congressional hearings. Rep. Hiester Clymer's Committee was investigating alleged corruption involving Secretary of War William W. Belknap (who had resigned March 2), along with President Grant's brother Orville and traders granted monopolies at frontier Army posts. It was alleged that Belknap had been selling these lucrative trading post positions where soldiers were required to make their purchases. Custer himself had experienced first hand the high prices being charged at Fort Lincoln.

Concerned that he might miss the coming campaign, Custer did not want to go to Washington. He asked to answer questions in writing, but Clymer insisted. Recognizing that his testimony would be explosive, Custer tried "to follow a moderate and prudent course, avoiding prominence." Despite this, he provided a quantity of unsubstantiated accusations against Belknap. His testimony, given on March 29 and April 4, was a sensation, being loudly praised by the Democratic press and sharply criticized by Republicans. Custer wrote articles published anonymously in The New York Herald that exposed trader post kickback rings and implied that Belknap was behind them. During his testimony, Custer attacked President Grant's brother Orville on unproven grounds of extorting money in exchange for exerting undue influence. Historian Stephen E. Ambrose speculated that around this time Custer was presented with the idea of becoming the Democratic candidate in the upcoming 1876 United States presidential election, adding further motivation for Custer to rejoin his regiment and win further accolades in the Sioux Wars.

After Custer testified, Belknap was impeached, and the case sent to the Senate for trial. Custer asked the impeachment managers to release him from further testimony. With the help of a request from his superior, Brigadier General Alfred Terry, Commander of the Department of Dakota, he was excused. However, President Grant intervened, ordering that another officer fulfill Custer's military duty. General Terry protested, arguing that he had no available officers of rank qualified to replace Custer. Both Sheridan and Sherman wanted Custer in command, but had to support Grant. General Sherman, hoping to resolve the issue, advised Custer to meet personally with Grant before leaving Washington. Three times Custer requested meetings with the president, but each request was refused.

Finally, Custer gave up and took a train to Chicago on May 2, planning to rejoin his regiment. A furious Grant ordered Sheridan to arrest Custer for leaving Washington without permission. On May 3, a member of Sheridan's staff arrested Custer as he arrived in Chicago. The arrest sparked public outrage. The New York Herald called Grant the "modern Caesar" and asked, "Are officers... to be dragged from railroad trains and ignominiously ordered to stand aside until the whims of the Chief magistrate ... are satisfied?"

Grant relented, but insisted that Terry—not Custer—personally command the expedition. Terry met Custer in St. Paul, Minnesota, on May 6. He later recalled that Custer "with tears in his eyes, begged for my aid. How could I resist it?" Custer and Terry both wrote telegrams to Grant asking that Custer be able to lead his regiment, with Terry in command. Sheridan endorsed the effort.

Grant was already under pressure for his treatment of Custer. His administration worried that if the "Sioux campaign" failed without Custer, then Grant would be blamed for ignoring the recommendations of senior Army officers. On May 8, Custer was told that he would lead the expedition, but only under Terry's direct supervision. Elated, Custer told General Terry's chief engineer, Captain Ludlow, that he would "cut loose" from Terry and operate independently.

== Battle of the Little Bighorn ==
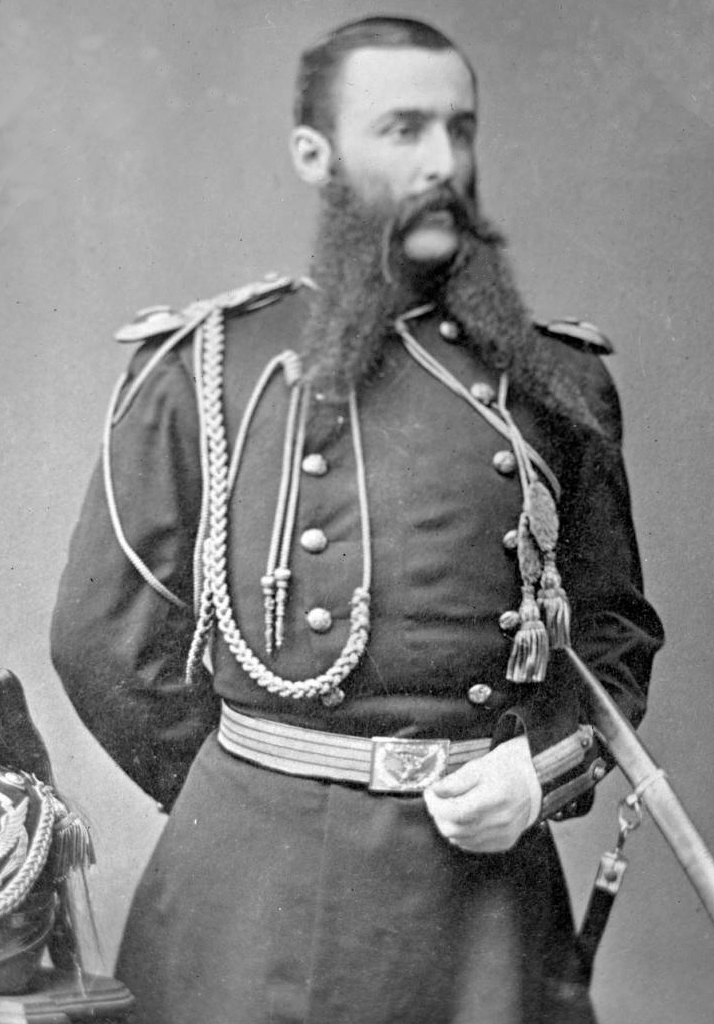
William W. Cooke, Custer's adjutant

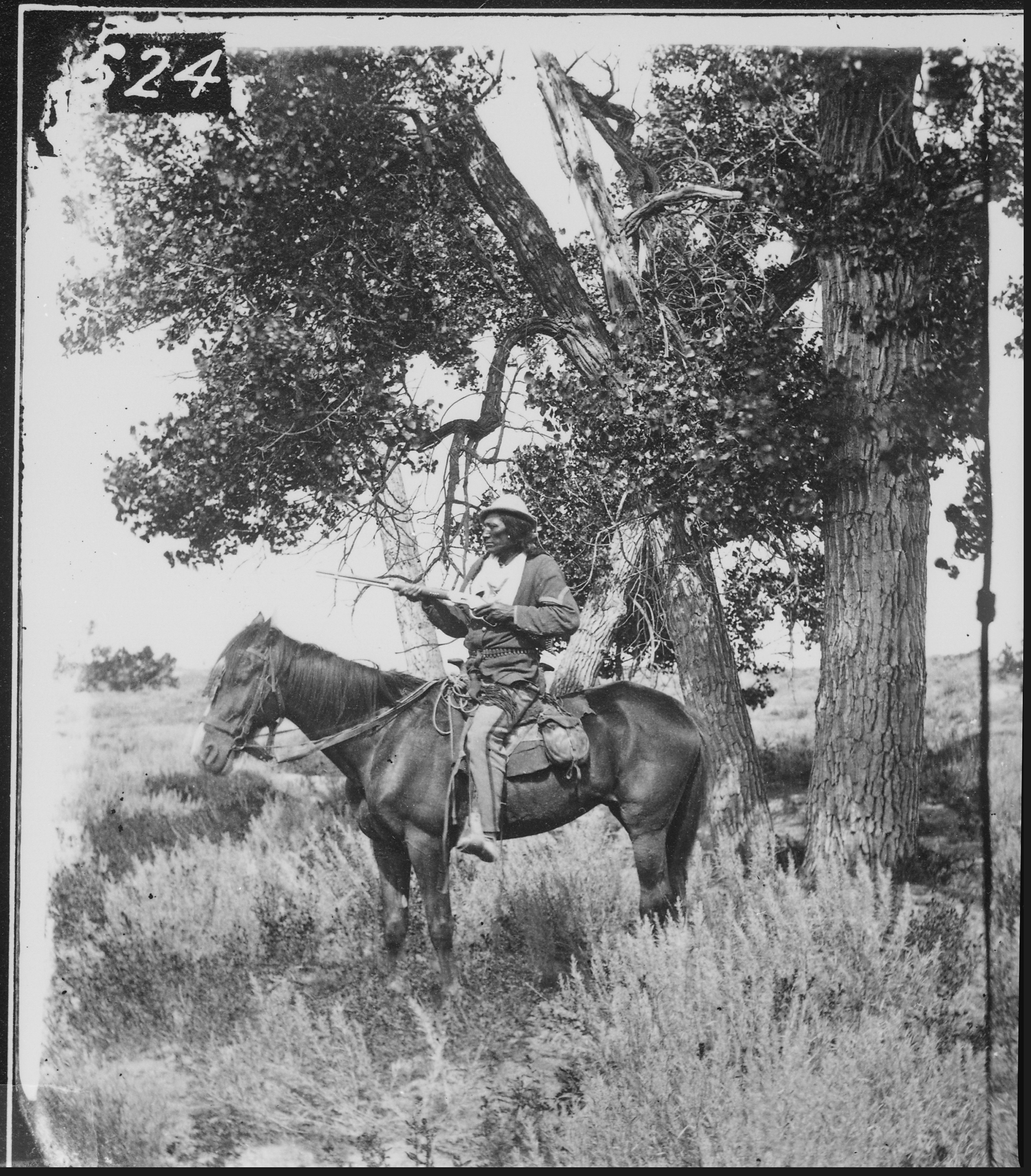
Bloody Knife, Custer's scout, on Yellowstone Expedition, 1873

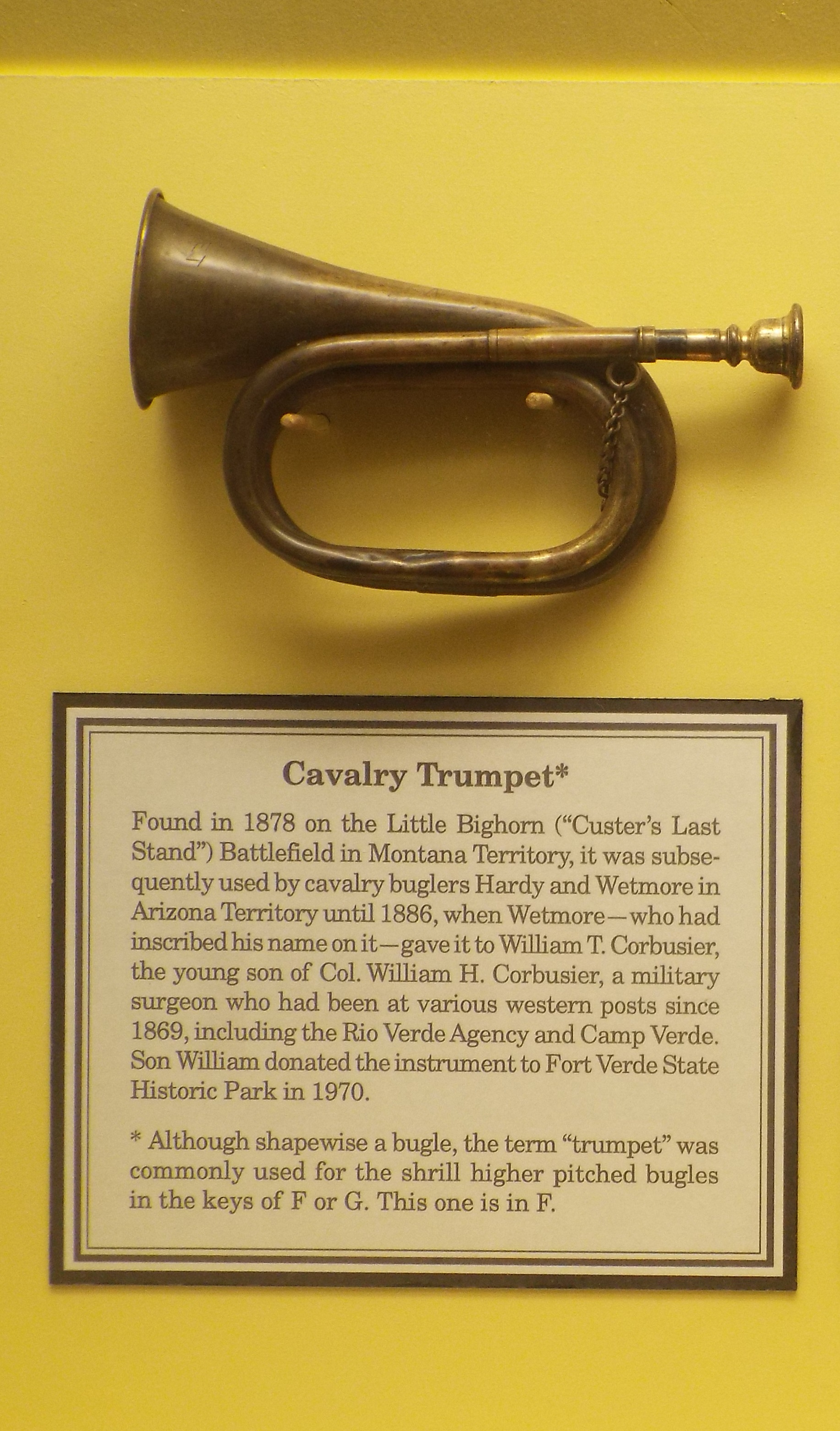
The 7th Cavalry's trumpet was found in 1878 on the grounds of the Little Bighorn Battlefield (Custer's Last Stand) and is on display in Camp Verde in Arizona

By the time of Custer's Black Hills Expedition in 1874, the level of conflict and tension between the U.S. and many of the Plains Indians tribes (including the Lakota Sioux and the Cheyenne) had become exceedingly high. European-Americans continually broke treaty agreements and advanced further westward, resulting in violence and acts of depredation by both sides. To take possession of the Black Hills (and thus the gold deposits), and to stop Indian attacks, the U.S. decided to corral all remaining free Plains Indians. The Grant government set a deadline of January 31, 1876, for all Lakota and Arapaho wintering in the "unceded territory" to report to their designated agencies (reservations) or be considered "hostile".

At that time, the 7th Cavalry's regimental commander, Colonel Samuel D. Sturgis, was on detached duty as the Superintendent of Mounted Recruiting Service and in command of the Cavalry Depot in St. Louis, Missouri, which left Lieutenant Colonel Custer in command of the regiment. Custer and the 7th Cavalry departed from Fort Abraham Lincoln on May 17, 1876, part of a larger army force planning to round up remaining free Indians. Meanwhile, in the spring and summer of 1876, the Hunkpapa Lakota holy man Sitting Bull had called together the largest gathering of Plains Indians at Ash Creek, Montana (later moved to the Little Bighorn River) to discuss what to do about the whites. It was this united encampment of Lakota, Northern Cheyenne, and Arapaho Indians that the 7th Cavalry met at the Battle of the Little Bighorn in the Crow Indian Reservation created in old Crow Country (in the Fort Laramie Treaty of 1851, the valley of the Little Bighorn is in the heart of the Crow Indian treaty territory and was accepted as such by the Lakota, the Cheyenne, and the Arapaho). The Lakotas were staying in the valley without consent from the Crow tribe, which sided with the Army to expel the Indian invaders.

Around June 15, Major Marcus Reno while scouting, discovered the trail of a large village on the Rosebud River. On June 22, Custer's entire regiment was detached to follow this trail. On June 25, some of Custer's Crow scouts identified what they claimed was a large Indian encampment in the valley near the Little Bighorn River. Custer had first intended to attack the Indian village the next day, but since his presence became known, he decided to attack immediately and divided his forces into three battalions: one led by Major Reno, one by Captain Frederick Benteen, and one by himself. Captain Thomas M. McDougall and Company B were with the pack train. Reno was sent north to charge the southern end of the encampment, Custer rode north, hidden to the east of the encampment by bluffs and planning to circle around and attack from the north, and Benteen was initially sent south and west to scout Indian presence and potentially protect the column from the south.

Reno began a charge on the southern end of the village, but halted some 500–600 yards short of the camp, and had his men dismount and form a skirmish line. They were soon overcome by mounted Lakota and Cheyenne warriors who counterattacked en masse against Reno's exposed left flank, forcing Reno and his men to take cover in the trees along the river. Eventually, the troopers engaged in a bloody retreat up the bluffs above the river, where they made their stand. This opening action of the battle cost Reno a quarter of his command.

Custer may have seen Reno stop and form a skirmish line while he led his command to the northern end of the main encampment, where he may have planned to sandwich the Indians between his attacking troopers and Reno's command in a "hammer and anvil" maneuver. According to Grinnell's account, based on the testimony of the Cheyenne warriors who survived the fight, at least part of Custer's command attempted to ford the river at the north end of the camp, but were driven off by Indian sharpshooters firing from the brush along the west bank of the river. From that point the soldiers were pursued by hundreds of warriors onto a ridge north of the encampment. Custer and his command were prevented from digging in by Crazy Horse. Those warriors had outflanked him and were now to his north, at the crest of the ridge. Traditional white accounts give credit to Gall for the attack that drove Custer up onto the ridge, but Indian witnesses have disputed that account.

Hurrah boys, we've got them! We'll finish them up and then go home to our station.

— Words reportedly said by General Custer early in the engagement.

For a time, Custer's men appear to have been deployed by company, in standard cavalry fighting formation—the skirmish line, with every fourth man holding the horses, though this arrangement would have robbed Custer of a quarter of his firepower. Worse, as the fight intensified, many soldiers could have taken to holding their own horses or hobbling them, further reducing the 7th's effective fire. When Crazy Horse and White Bull mounted the charge that broke through the center of Custer's lines, order may have broken down among the soldiers of Calhoun's command, though Myles Keogh's men seem to have fought and died where they stood. According to some Lakota accounts, many of the panicked soldiers threw down their weapons and either rode or ran towards the knoll where Custer, the other officers, and about 40 men were making a stand. Along the way, the warriors rode them down, counting coup by striking the fleeing troopers with their quirts or lances.

Initially, Custer had 208 officers and men under his direct command, with an additional 142 under Reno, just over 100 under Benteen, and 50 soldiers with Captain McDougall's rearguard, accompanied by 84 soldiers under 1st Lieutenant Edward Gustave Mathey with the pack train. The Lakota-Cheyenne coalition may have fielded over 1,800 warriors. Historian Gregory Michno settles on a low number of around 1,000 based on contemporary Lakota testimony, but other sources place the number at 1,800 or 2,000, especially in the works by Utley and Fox. The 1,800–2,000 figure is substantially lower than the higher numbers of 3,000 or more postulated by Ambrose, Gray, Scott, and others. Some of the other participants in the battle gave higher estimates:

- Spotted Horn Bull – 5,000 warriors and leaders
- Maj. Reno – 2,500 to 5,000 warriors
- Capt. Moylan – 3,500 to 4,000
- Lt. Hare – not under 4,000
- Lt. Godfrey – minimum between 2,500 and 3,000
- Lt. Edgerly – 4,000
- Lt. Varnum – not less than 4,000
- Sgt. Kanipe – fully 4,000
- George Herendeen – fully 3,000
- Fred Gerard – 2,500 to 3,000

An average of the above is 3,500 Indigenous warriors and leaders.

As the troopers of Custer's five companies were cut down, the native warriors stripped the dead of their firearms and ammunition, with the result that the return fire from the cavalry steadily decreased, while firing from the Indians constantly increased. The surviving troopers apparently shot their remaining horses to use as breastworks for a final stand on the knoll at the north end of the ridge. The warriors closed in for the final attack and killed every man in Custer's command. As a result, the Battle of the Little Bighorn has come to be popularly known as "Custer's Last Stand".

== Personal life ==
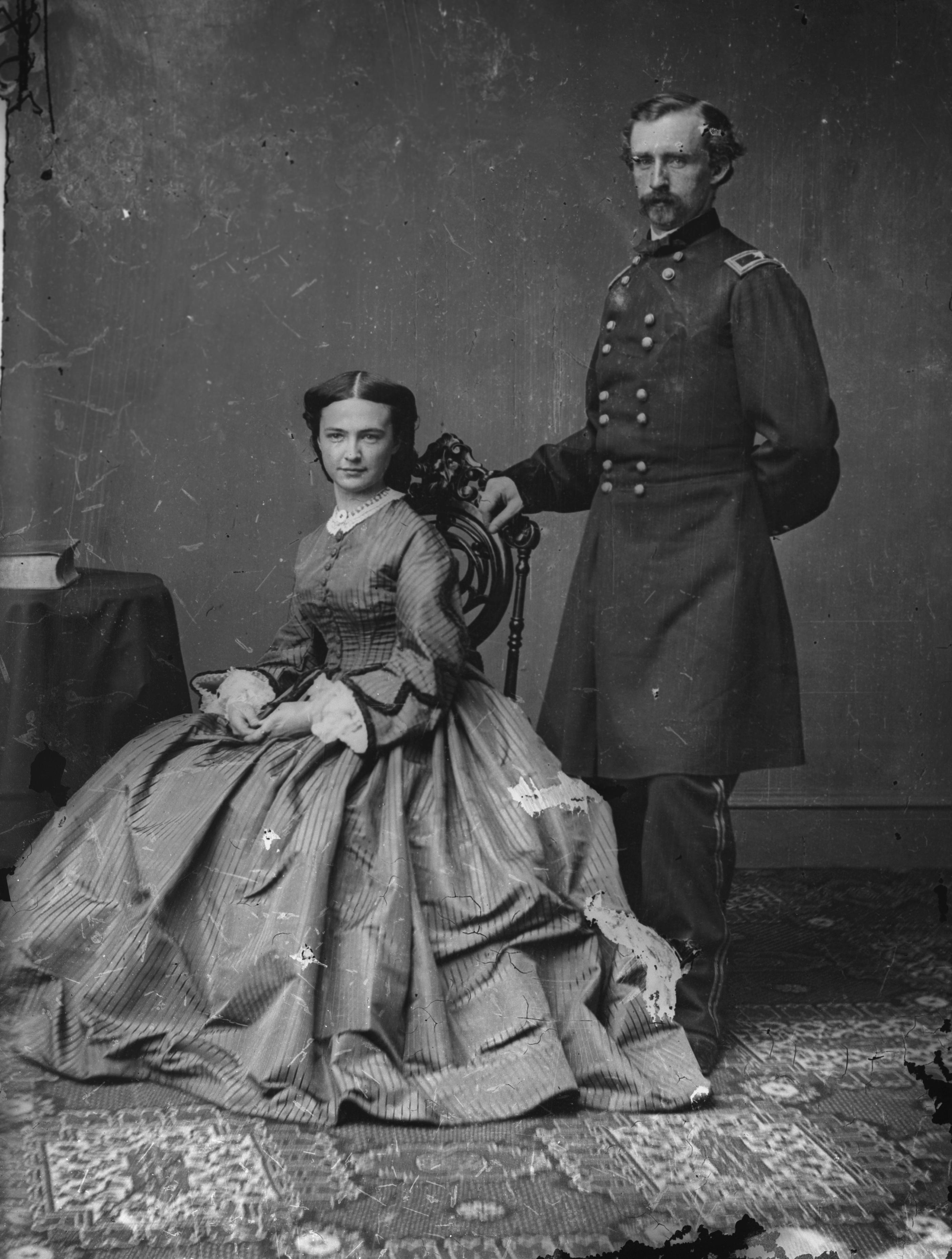
George and Libbie Custer, 1864

On February 9, 1864, Custer married Elizabeth Clift Bacon (1842–1933), whom he had first seen when he was 10 years old. He had been socially introduced to her in November 1862, when home in Monroe on leave. She was not initially impressed with him, and her father, Judge Daniel Bacon, disapproved of Custer as a match because he was the son of a blacksmith. It was not until well after Custer had been promoted to the rank of brigadier general that he gained the approval of Judge Bacon. He married Elizabeth Bacon 14 months after they formally met.

In November 1868, following the Battle of Washita River, Custer was alleged (by Captain Frederick Benteen, chief of scouts Ben Clark, and Cheyenne oral tradition) to have unofficially married Mo-nah-se-tah, daughter of the Cheyenne chief Little Rock, in the winter or early spring of 1868–1869 (Little Rock was killed in the one-day action at Washita on November 27). Mo-nah-se-tah gave birth to a child in January 1869, two months after the Washita battle. Cheyenne oral history tells that she also bore a second child fathered by Custer in late 1869. Some historians, however, believe that Custer had become sterile after contracting gonorrhea while at West Point and that the father was in actuality his brother Thomas. Clarke's description in his memoirs included the statement, "Custer picked out a fine looking one and had her in his tent every night."

In addition to "Autie", Custer acquired several nicknames. During the Civil War, after his promotion to become the youngest brigadier general in the Army aged 23, the press called him "The Boy General". During his years on the Great Plains in the American Indian Wars, his troopers referred to him with grudging admiration as "Iron Butt" and "Hard Ass" for his stamina in the saddle and strict discipline, as well as with the more derisive "Ringlets" for his long, curling blond hair, which he perfumed with cinnamon-scented hair oil.

Throughout his travels, he gathered geological specimens, sending them to the University of Michigan. On September 10, 1873, he wrote Libbie, "the Indian battles hindered the collecting, while in that immediate region it was unsafe to go far from the command...."

During his service in Kentucky, Custer bought thoroughbred horses. He took two on his last campaign, Vic (for Victory) and Dandy. During the march he changed horses every three hours. He rode Vic into his last battle. Custer took his two staghounds Tuck and Bleuch with him during the last expedition. He left them with orderly Burkman when he rode into battle. Burkman joined the packtrain. He regretted not accompanying Custer but lived until 1925, when he took his own life.

=== Appearance ===
Custer was fastidious in his grooming. Early in their marriage, Libbie wrote, "He brushes his teeth after every meal. I always laugh at him for it, also for washing his hands so frequently." He was 5'11" tall and wore a size 38 jacket and size 9C boots. At various times he weighed between 143 pounds (at the end of the 1869 Kansas campaign) and a muscular 170 pounds. A splendid horseman, "Custer mounted was an inspiration." He was quite fit, able to jump to a standing position from lying flat on his back. He was a "power sleeper", able to get by on short naps after falling asleep immediately on lying down. He "had a habit of throwing himself prone on the grass for a few minutes' rest and resembled a human island, entirely surrounded by crowding, panting dogs".

The common media image of Custer's appearance at the Last Stand—buckskin coat and long, curly blonde hair—is wrong. Although he and several other officers wore buckskin coats on the expedition, they took them off and packed them away because it was so hot. According to Soldier, an Arikara scout, "Custer took off his buckskin coat and tied it behind his saddle." Further, Custer—whose hair was thinning—joined a similarly balding Lieutenant Varnum and "had the clippers run over their heads" before leaving Fort Lincoln.

== Death ==
It is unlikely that any Native American recognized Custer during or after the battle. Michno summarizes: "Shave Elk said, 'We did not suspect that we were fighting Custer and did not recognize him either alive or dead.' Wooden Leg said no one could recognize any enemy during the fight, for they were too far away. The Cheyenne warriors did not even know a man named Custer was in the fight until weeks later. Antelope said none knew of Custer being at the fight until they later learned of it at the agencies. Thomas Marquis learned from his interviews that no Indian knew Custer was at the Little Bighorn fight until months later. Many Cheyenne were not even aware that other members of the Custer family had been in the fight until 1922 when Marquis himself first informed them of that fact."

Several individuals claimed responsibility for killing Custer, including White Bull of the Miniconjous, Rain-in-the-Face, Flat Lip, and Brave Bear. In June 2005, at a public meeting, Northern Cheyenne storytellers said that according to their oral tradition, Buffalo Calf Road Woman, a Northern Cheyenne heroine of the Battle of the Rosebud, struck the final blow against Custer, which knocked him off his horse before he died. She hit him with a club-like instrument.

A contrasting version of Custer's death is suggested by the testimony of an Oglala named Joseph White Cow Bull, according to novelist and Custer biographer Evan Connell. He says that Joseph White Bull stated he had shot a rider wearing a buckskin jacket and big hat at the riverside when the soldiers first approached the village from the east. The initial force facing the soldiers, according to this version, was quite small (possibly as few as four warriors) yet challenged Custer's command. The rider who was hit had shouted orders that prompted the soldiers to attack and was next to a rider who bore a flag, but when the buckskin-clad rider fell off his horse after being shot, many of the attackers reined up. The allegation that the buckskin-clad officer was Custer, if accurate, might explain the supposed rapid disintegration of Custer's forces. However, several other officers of the Seventh, including William Cooke, Tom Custer and William Sturgis, were also dressed in buckskin on the day of the battle, and the fact that each of the non-mutilation wounds to George Custer's body (a bullet wound below the heart and a shot to the left temple) would have been instantly fatal casts doubt on his being wounded or killed at the ford, more than a mile from where his body was found. The circumstances are, however, consistent with David Humphreys Miller's suggestion that Custer's subordinates would not have left his dead body behind to be desecrated.

During the 1920s, two elderly Cheyenne women spoke briefly with oral historians about their having recognized Custer's body on the battlefield and said that they had stopped a Sioux warrior from desecrating the body. The women were relatives of Mo-nah-se-tah, who had allegedly borne two children with Custer. Mo-nah-se-tah was among 53 Cheyenne women and children taken captive by the 7th Cavalry after the Battle of Washita River in 1868 in which Custer commanded an attack on the camp of Chief Black Kettle. Mo-nah-se-tah's father Cheyenne chief Little Rock was killed in the battle.

During the winter and early spring of 1868–1869, Custer reportedly sexually assaulted teenage Mo-nah-se-tah. Cheyenne oral history alleges that she later bore Custer's child in late 1869. Custer, however, had apparently become sterile after contracting venereal disease at West Point, leading some historians to believe that the father was really his brother Thomas. In the Cheyenne culture of the time, such a relationship was considered a marriage. The women allegedly told the warrior: "Stop, he is a relative of ours," and then shooed him away. The two women said they shoved their sewing awls into his ears to permit Custer's corpse to "hear better in the afterlife" because he had broken his promise to Stone Forehead never to fight against Native Americans again.

When the main column under General Terry arrived two days later, the army found most of the soldiers' corpses stripped, scalped, and mutilated. Custer's body had two bullet holes, one in the left temple and one just below the heart. Capt. Benteen, who inspected the body, stated that in his opinion the fatal injuries had not been the result of .45 caliber ammunition, which implies the bullet holes had been caused by ranged rifle fire. Some time later, Lieutenant Edward S. Godfrey described Custer's mutilation, telling Charles F. Bates, that an arrow "had been forced up his penis."

The bodies of Custer and his brother Tom were wrapped in canvas and blankets, then buried in a shallow grave, covered by the basket from a travois held in place by rocks. When soldiers returned a year later, the brothers' grave had been scavenged by animals and the bones scattered. "Not more than a double handful of small bones were picked up." Custer was reinterred with full military honors at West Point Cemetery on October 10, 1877. The battle site was designated a National Cemetery in 1886.

== Controversial legacy ==
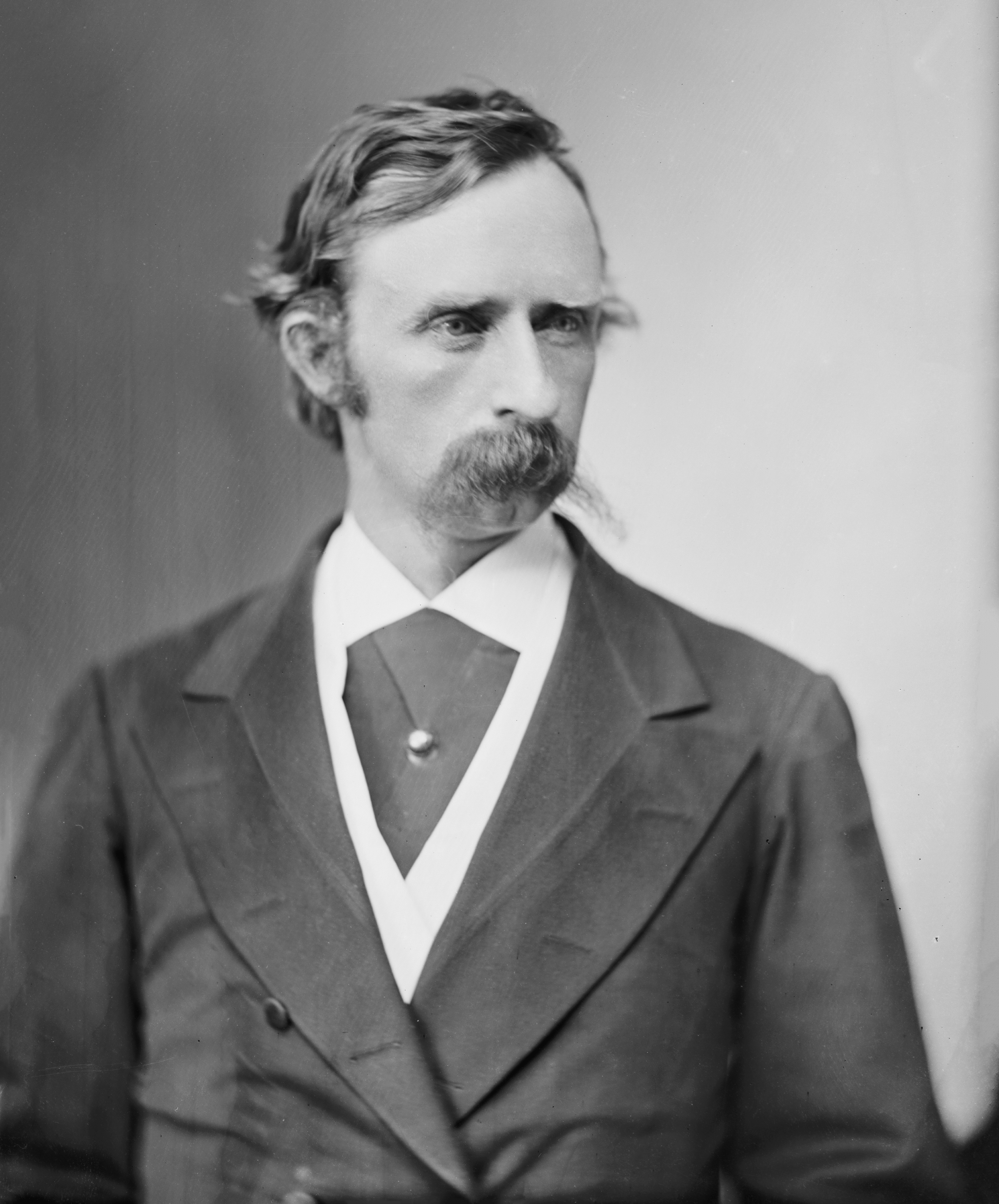
George A. Custer in civilian clothes, December 1869

=== Public relations and media coverage during his lifetime ===
Custer has been called a "media personality", and he valued good public relations and used the print media of his era effectively. He frequently invited journalists to accompany his campaigns (one, Associated Press reporter Mark Kellogg, died at the Little Bighorn), and their favorable reporting contributed to his high reputation, which lasted well into the latter 20th century. Effusive praise from William Eleroy Curtis, the first journalist to report the discovery of gold in the Black Hills, laid the foundation for Custer's status as a hero who furthered the "manifest destiny" of the United States.

Custer enjoyed writing, often writing all night long. Before leaving the steamer Far West for the final leg of the journey, Custer wrote all night. His orderly John Burkman stood guard in front of his tent and on the morning of June 22, 1876, found Custer "hunched over on the cot, just his coat and his boots off, and the pen still in his hand." Custer wrote a series of magazine articles of his experiences on the frontier, which were published in book form as My Life on the Plains in 1874. The work is still a valued primary source for information on U.S.-Native relations.

=== Posthumous legacy ===
After his death, Custer achieved lasting fame. Custer's wife Elizabeth, who had accompanied him in many of his frontier expeditions, did much to advance his fame with the publication of several books about her late husband: Boots and Saddles, Life with General Custer in Dakota, Tenting on the Plains, or General Custer in Kansas and Texas and Following the Guidon, thus enhancing a "Custer myth". The emergence of this myth was also supported by the secrecy of the Official Record of the 1879 Court of Inquiry, which was not released until 1951.

The deaths of Custer and his troops became the best-known episode in the history of the American Indian Wars, due in part to a painting commissioned by the brewery Anheuser-Busch as part of an advertising campaign. The enterprising company ordered reprints of a dramatic work that depicted "Custer's Last Stand" and had them framed and hung in many United States saloons. This created lasting impressions of the battle and the brewery's products in the minds of many bar patrons. Henry Wadsworth Longfellow wrote an adoring (and in some places, erroneous) poem. President Theodore Roosevelt's lavish praise pleased Custer's widow.

President Grant, a highly successful general but recent antagonist, criticized Custer's actions in the battle of the Little Bighorn. Quoted in the New York Herald on September 2, 1876, Grant said, "I regard Custer's Massacre as a sacrifice of troops, brought on by Custer himself, that was wholly unnecessary – wholly unnecessary." General Philip Sheridan took a more moderately critical view of Custer's final military actions.

General Nelson Miles, who inherited Custer's reputation as a skilled Indian fighter, and others praised him as a fallen hero betrayed by the incompetence of subordinate officers. Miles noted the difficulty of winning a fight "with seven-twelfths of the command remaining out of the engagement when within sound of his rifle shots".

The assessment of Custer's actions during the American Indian Wars has undergone substantial reconsideration in modern times. Documenting the arc of popular perception in his biography Son of the Morning Star (1984), author Evan S. Connell notes the reverential tone of Custer's first biographer Frederick Whittaker, whose book was rushed out the year of Custer's death. Connell concludes:

These days it is stylish to denigrate the general, whose stock sells for nothing. Nineteenth-century Americans thought differently. At that time he was a cavalier without fear and beyond reproach.

In 1953, W.A. Graham stated in The Custer Myth:

But for the "blaze of glory" that formed the setting for his dramatically tragic departure at the hands of yelling savages, he would probably be just another name of a long list of names in our histories of the Civil War, in which as "The Boy General" he made an outstanding record as a leader of Cavalry, as did also numerous others who have been long since all but forgotten.

=== Criticism and debate ===
==== Debate over tactics ====
When writing about Custer, neutral ground is elusive. What should Custer have done at any of the critical junctures that rapidly presented themselves, each now the subject of endless speculation and rumination? There will always be a variety of opinions based upon what Custer knew, what he did not know, and what he could not have known...

— from Touched by Fire: The Life, Death, and Mythic Afterlife of George Armstrong Custer by Louise Barnett.

The assignment of blame for the disaster at Little Bighorn continues to this day. Major Marcus Reno's failure to press his attack on the south end of the Lakota/Cheyenne village and his flight to the timber along the river after a single casualty have been cited as a factor in the destruction of Custer's battalion, as has Captain Frederick Benteen's allegedly tardy arrival on the field and the failure of the two officers' combined forces to move toward the relief of Custer. Some of Custer's critics have asserted tactical errors.

- While camped at Powder River, Custer refused the support offered by General Terry on June 21 of an additional four companies of the Second Cavalry. Custer stated that he "could whip any Indian village on the Plains" with his own regiment and that extra troops would simply be a burden.
- At the same time, he left behind at the steamer Far West on the Yellowstone a battery of Gatling guns, although he knew he was facing superior numbers. Before leaving the camp, all the troops, including the officers, also boxed their sabers and sent them back with the wagons.
- On the day of the battle, Custer divided his 600-man command, despite being faced with vastly superior numbers of Sioux and Cheyenne and disregarding his scouts' warnings that it would be inadvisable in that situation.
- The refusal of an extra battalion reduced the size of his force by at least a sixth, and rejecting the firepower offered by the Gatling guns played into the events of June 25 to the disadvantage of his regiment.

Custer's defenders, however, including historian Charles K. Hofling, have asserted that Gatling guns would have been slow and cumbersome as the troops crossed the rough country between the Yellowstone and the Little Bighorn. Custer rated speed in gaining the battlefield as essential and more important. Supporters of Custer claim that splitting the forces was a standard tactic, so as to demoralize the enemy with the appearance of the cavalry in different places all at once, especially when a contingent threatened the line of retreat.

U.S. Air Force Academy military historian David Mills rates Custer among The Worst Military Leaders in History in that 2022 anthology. His personal courage and skill as a cavalryman notwithstanding, "Custer was lucky rather than good, and it was only a matter of time before his carelessness caught up with him." He quotes Grant as writing to Sherman that Little Bighorn was "a sacrifice of troops brought on by Custer himself that was wholly unnecessary." Focusing on Custer's failure to heed the intelligence about the true numbers of Sioux forces that day, Mills observes that "personal bravery and unthinking aggression are no substitute for careful consideration of the enemy's disposition; nor is luck a substitute for competence."

==== Attacks on Indigenous peoples ====
Sharply criticizing the self-styled "Indian fighter", U.S. Indigenous people's organized movements have emphasized Custer's role in the U.S. government's treaty violations and other injustices against Native Americans.

Standing Rock Sioux theologian and author Vine Deloria Jr. made a comparison between Custer and Nazi SS officer Adolf Eichmann, referring to Custer as the "Eichmann of the Plains" in a 1996 Los Angeles Times interview. In his 1969 book Custer Died for Your Sins, Deloria condemned Custer's violations of the 1868 Fort Laramie Treaty that established the Black Hills region as unceded territory of the Sioux and Arapaho peoples. Custer's violations of the Fort Laramie Treaty included an 1874 gold expedition and the 1876 Battle of Greasy Grass (Battle of the Little Bighorn).

Critics have also highlighted Custer's 1868 Washita River surprise attack that killed Cheyenne non-combatants including mothers, children, and elders. Custer was following Generals William Sherman and Philip Sheridan's orders for "total war" on the Indigenous nations. Describing total war methods, Sherman wrote, "We must act with vindictive earnestness against the Sioux, even to their extermination, men, women, and children...during an assault, the soldiers can not pause to distinguish between male and female, or even discriminate as to age." There is credible evidence that, following the attack, Custer and his men sexually assaulted female captives. Another historian writes, "There was a saying among the soldiers of the western frontier, a saying Custer and his officers could heartily endorse: 'Indian women rape easy.'"

Indigenous criticism of Custer's posthumous legacy may have begun immediately after Custer died. Good Fox (Lakota) recounted:

"I was told that after the battle two Cheyenne women came across Custer's body. They knew him, because he had attacked their peaceful village on the Washita. These women said, 'You smoked the peace pipe with us. Our chiefs told you that you would be killed if you ever made war on us again. But you would not listen. This will make you hear better.' The women each took an awl from their beaded cases and stuck them deep into Custer's ears."

In 1976, the American Indian Movement (AIM) celebrated the centennial of Sioux, Cheyenne, and Arapaho victory in the Battle of Greasy Grass, performing a victory dance around the marker of Custer's death. AIM continued protesting there, demanding the official renaming of the "Custer Battlefield," finally winning this demand in 1991.

From the mid-2010s, when Native American veterans hold their powwow celebrations, Custer's personal guidon flag is dragged on the ground. This is meant as an act of indigenous historical/cultural reclamation as the Battle of Little Bighorn was one of the rare victories of Native Americans against the United States.

In May 2021, the United Tribes of Michigan unanimously passed a resolution calling for the removal of a Custer statue in Monroe, Michigan. The resolution stated in part:

"(It) is widely perceived as offensive and a painful public reminder of the legacy of Indigenous people's genocide and present realities of systemic racism in our country... Custer is notoriously known as the 'Indian Killer' [...] Custer does not deserve any glory, nor the right to further torment minoritized citizens 145 years postmortem."

== Monuments and memorials ==
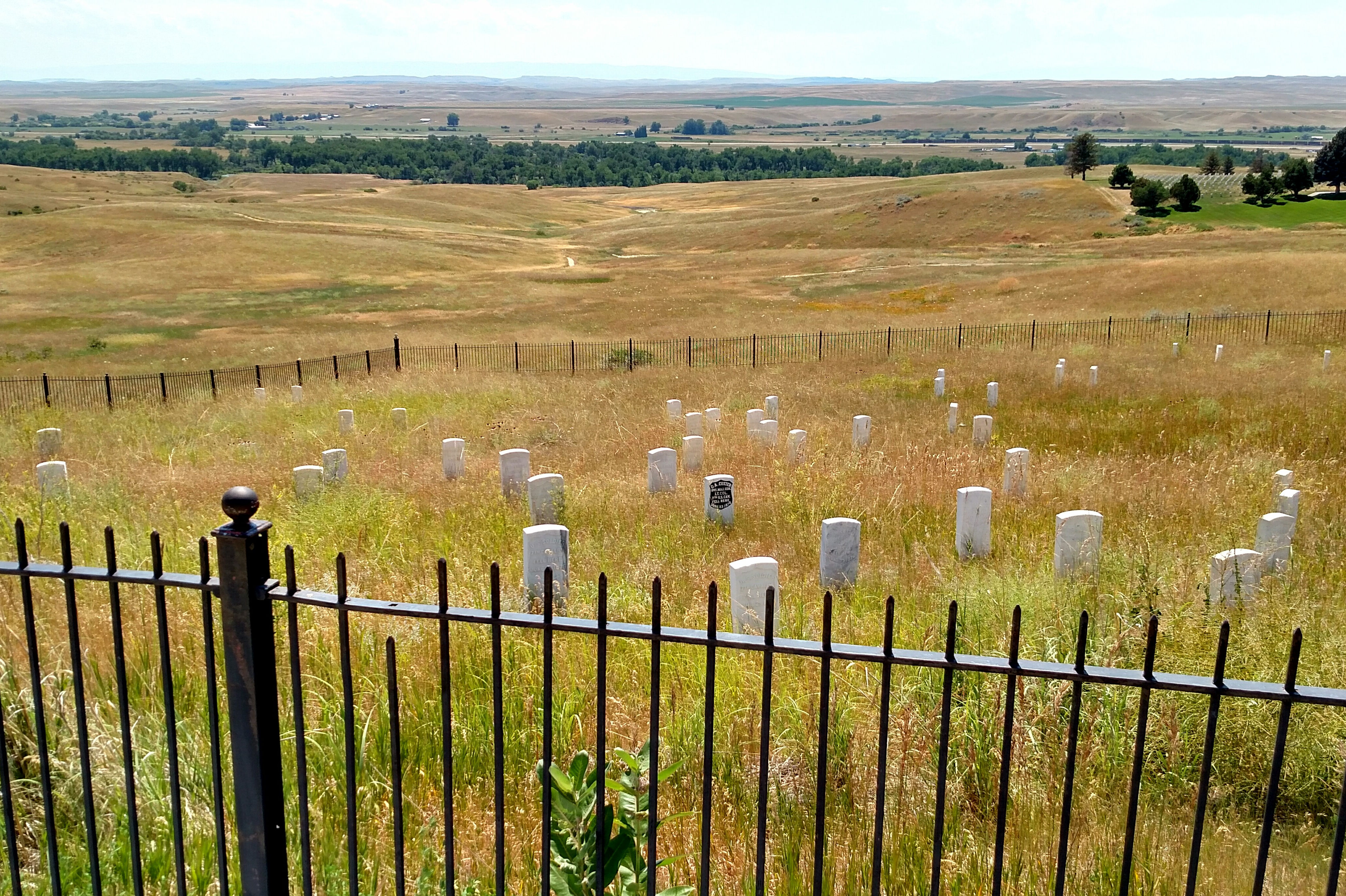
Marker indicating where Custer fell on "Last Stand Hill" during Battle of the Little Bighorn – Crow Agency, Montana

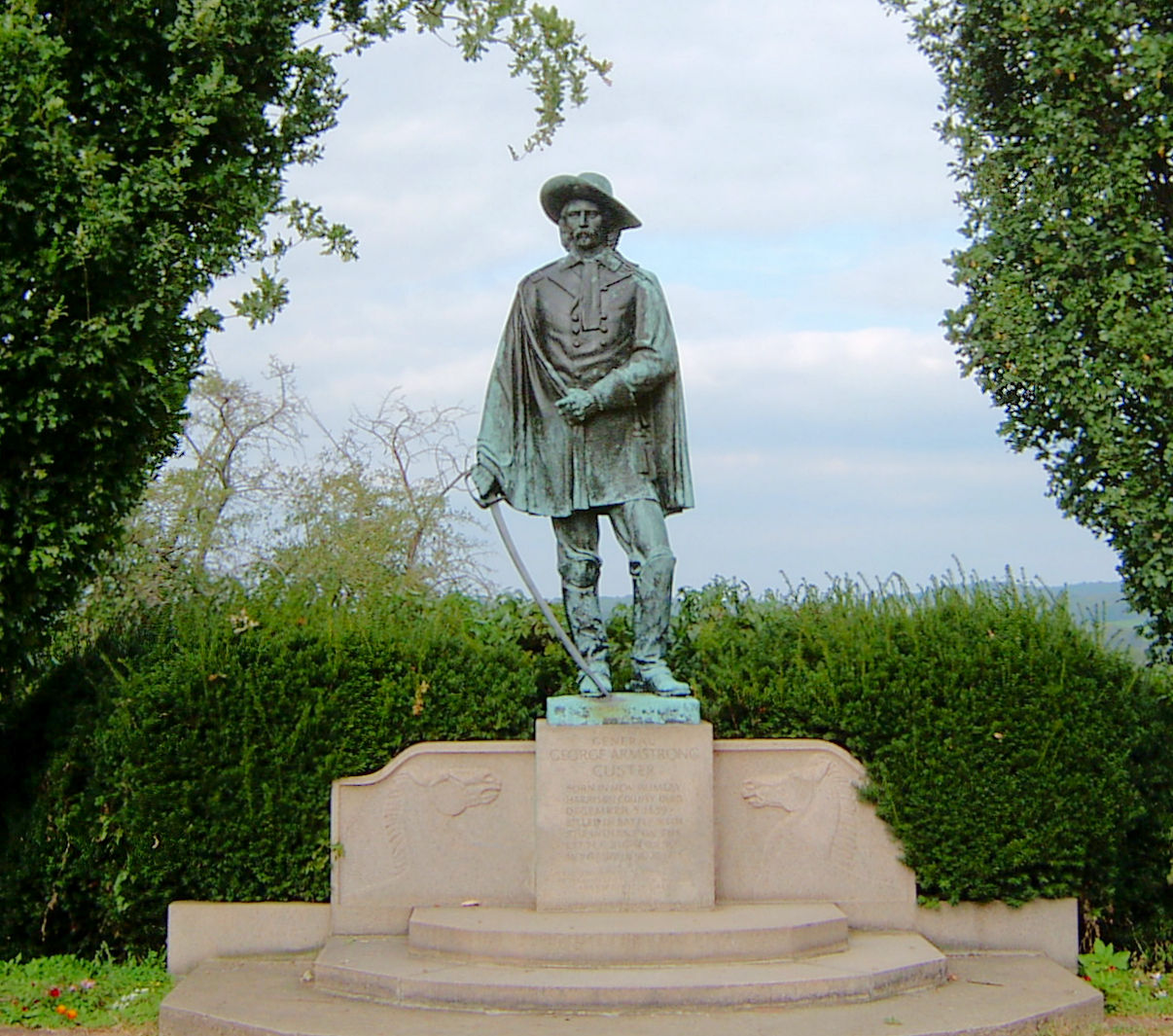
Custer Memorial at his birthplace in New Rumley, Ohio

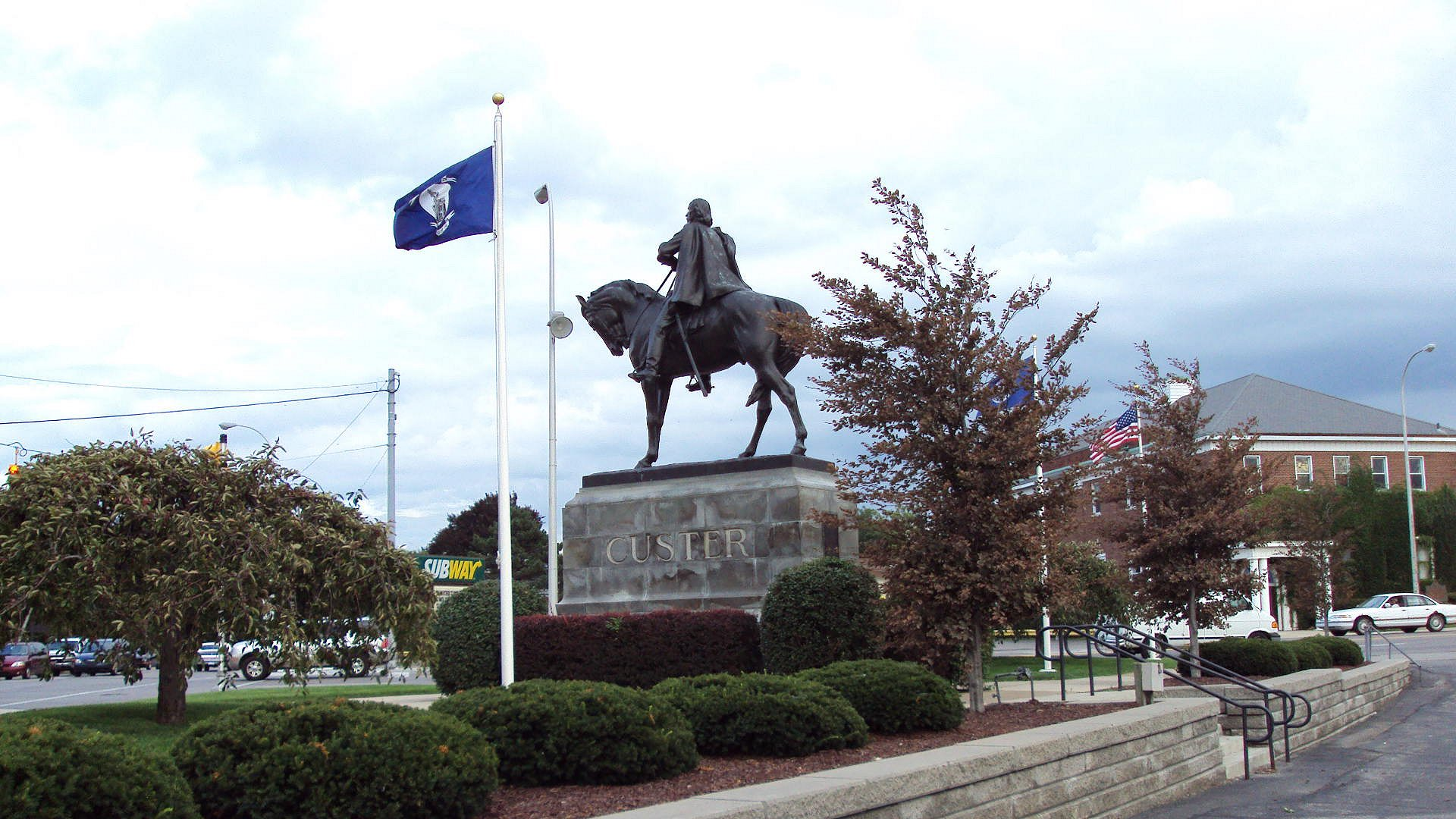
Monroe, Michigan, Custer's childhood home, unveiled the George Armstrong Custer Equestrian Monument in 1910

- Counties are named in Custer's honor in six states: Colorado, Idaho (which is named for the General Custer Mine, which was named for Custer), Montana, Nebraska, Oklahoma, and South Dakota.
- Townships in Illinois, Michigan, and Minnesota were named for Custer.
- Other municipalities named after Custer include the villages of Custer, Michigan, and Custar, Ohio; the city of Custer, South Dakota, and Custer City, Oklahoma; and the unincorporated town of Custer, Wisconsin.
- Custer National Cemetery is within Little Bighorn Battlefield National Monument, the site of Custer's death.
- The George Armstrong Custer Equestrian Monument of Custer, by Edward Clark Potter, was erected in Monroe, Michigan, Custer's boyhood home, in 1910.
- Fort Custer National Military Reservation, near Augusta, Michigan, was built in 1917 on 130 parcels of land, as part of the military mobilization for World War I. During the war, some 90,000 troops passed through Camp Custer.
- The establishment of Fort Custer National Cemetery (originally Fort Custer Post Cemetery) took place on September 18, 1943, with the first interment. On Memorial Day 1982, more than 33 years after the first resolution had been introduced in Congress, impressive ceremonies marked the official opening of the cemetery.
- Custer Hill is the main troop billeting area at Fort Riley, Kansas. Custer's 1866 residence on the post has been preserved and is currently maintained as the Custer House Museum and meeting space (also sometimes referred to as Custer Home).
- The 85th Infantry Division was nicknamed The Custer Division.
- The Black Hills of South Dakota are replete with evidence of Custer, with a county, town, and Custer State Park all located in the area.
- A prominent mountain peak in the Black Hills bears his name.
- The Custer house at Fort Abraham Lincoln, near present-day Mandan, North Dakota, has been reconstructed as it was in Custer's day, along with the soldiers' barracks, block houses, and more. Annual re-enactments are held of Custer's 7th Cavalry's leaving for the Little Bighorn.
- On July 2, 2008, a marble monument to Brigadier General Custer was dedicated at the site of the 1863 Civil War Battle of Hunterstown, in Adams County, Pennsylvania.
- Custer Monument at the United States Military Academy was first unveiled in 1879. It now stands next to his grave in the West Point Cemetery.
- Custer Memorial Monument at his birthplace was erected by the Ohio State Archaeological and Historical society in 1931. It is located near the remains of the foundation of his birthplace homestead in New Rumley, Ohio. Custer Monument is managed locally by the Custer Memorial Association.
- The SS George A. Custer, a Liberty Ship built in World War II, was named for him.

== Dates of rank ==
Insignia	Rank	Date	Component
None	Cadet	July 1, 1857	United States Military Academy
	Second Lieutenant	June 24, 1861	2nd Cavalry Regiment, Regular Army
	Captain	June 5, 1862	Temporary aide de camp (Discharged on March 31, 1863.)
	First Lieutenant	July 17, 1862	5th Cavalry Regiment, Regular Army
	Brigadier General	June 29, 1863	Volunteers
	Brevet Major	July 3, 1863	Regular Army
	Captain	May 8, 1864	5th Cavalry Regiment, Regular Army
	Brevet Lieutenant Colonel	May 11, 1864	Regular Army
	Brevet Colonel	September 19, 1864	Regular Army
	Brevet Major General	October 19, 1864	Volunteers
	Brevet Brigadier General	March 13, 1865	Regular Army
	Brevet Major General	March 13, 1865	Regular Army
	Major General	April 15, 1865	Volunteers (Mustered out on February 1, 1866.)
	Lieutenant Colonel	July 28, 1866	7th Cavalry Regiment, Regular Army

== See also ==
- Garryowen march song
- German-Americans in the Civil War
- Half Yellow Face
- List of American Civil War generals (Union)
- List of German Americans
- List of photographs of George Armstrong Custer
- White Swan

== Bibliography ==
External videos
- Booknotes interview with Louise Barnett on Touched by Fire, October 13, 1996, C-SPAN

- Adams, Michael C.C. (2006). "George Armstrong Custer". In Hall, Dennis G.; Hall, Susan (eds.). American icons: an encyclopedia of the people, places, and things that have shaped our culture. Westport, Connecticut: Greenwood Press. ISBN 978-0-275-98429-8.
- Ambrose, Stephen E. (1986) [1975]. Crazy Horse and Custer: The Parallel Lives of Two American Warriors. New York: New American Library. ISBN 978-0-452-00802-1.
- Barnett, Louise (1996). Touched by Fire: The Life, Death, and Mythic Afterlife of George Armstrong Custer. New York: Henry Holt and Company, Inc. ISBN 978-0-8050-3720-3.
- Bates, Charles Francis (1936). Custer's Indian Battles. Bronxville, New York: Privately printed. hdl:2027/mdp.39015029551432. OCLC 622267413.
- Brininstool, E. A. (1994) [1952]. Troopers with Custer: Historic Incidents of the Battle of the Little Bighorn (2nd ed.). Mechanicsburg, Pennsylvania: Stackpole Books. ISBN 978-0-8117-1742-7.
- Brown, Dee (1970). Bury my Heart at Wounded Knee. New York: Holt, Rinehart & Winston. ISBN 978-0-03-085322-7.
- Camp, Walter Mason (1976). Hammer, Kenneth (ed.). Custer in '76: Walter Camp's Notes on the Custer Fight. Provo, Utah: Brigham Young University Press. ISBN 978-0-8425-0399-0.
- Carhart, Tom (2005). Lost Triumph: Lee's Real Plan at Gettysburg and Why It Failed. New York: G. P. Putnam & Sons. ISBN 978-0-399-15249-8.
- Connell, Evan S. (1984). Son Of The Morning Star. San Francisco, California: North Point Press. ISBN 978-0-86547-160-3.
- Coughlin, T. M. Coughlin (1980). Varnum: The Last of Custer's Lieutenants. Bryan, Texas: Privately printed. OCLC 6718139.
- Custer, Elizabeth Bacon (1885). Boots and Saddles: Or, Life in Dakota with General Custer. New York: Harper & Brothers. OCLC 2486406.
- Custer, Elizabeth Bacon (1887). Tenting on the Plains, or General Custer in Kansas and Texas. New York: Charles L. Webster and Company. OCLC 1032680250.
- Deloria, Vine Jr. (1970) [1969]. Custer Died for Your Sins: An Indian Manifesto. New York: Avon. OCLC 23797.
- Donovan, Jim (2011). Custer and the Little Bighorn: The Man, The Mystery, The Myth. New York: Crestline. ISBN 978-0-7858-2589-0.
- Dunbar-Ortiz, Roxanne (2014). An Indigenous Peoples' History of the United States. Boston: Beacon Press. ISBN 978-0-8070-5783-4.
- Dunlay, Thomas W. (1982). Wolves for the Blue Soldiers: Indian Scouts and Auxiliaries with the United States Army, 1860–90. Lincoln, Nebraska: University of Nebraska Press. ISBN 978-0-8032-6573-8.
- Fougera, Katherine Gibson (1986) [1940]. With Custer's Cavalry. Lincoln, Nebraska: University of Nebraska Press. ISBN 978-0-8032-1973-1.
- Frost, Lawrence A. (1976). General Custer's Libbie. Seattle: Superior Publishing Co. ISBN 978-0-87564-806-4.
- Gallagher, Gary W. (2006). The Shenandoah Valley Campaign of 1864. Chapel Hill, North Carolina: University of North Carolina Press. ISBN 978-0-8078-7711-1.
- Goodrich, Thomas (1997). Scalp Dance: Indian Warfare on the High Plains, 1865–1879. Mechanicsburg, Pennsylvania: Stackpole Books. ISBN 978-0-8117-1523-2.
- Graham, William Alexander; Dustin, Fred (1953). The Custer Myth: A Source Book of Custeriana. Harrisburg, Pennsylvania: Stackpole Company. OCLC 944258.
- Greene, Jerome A. (2004). Washita: The U.S. Army and the Southern Cheyenne, 1867–1869. Campaigns and Commanders Series. Norman, Oklahoma: University of Oklahoma Press. ISBN 978-0-8061-3551-9.
- Grinnell, George Bird (1956) [1915]. The Fighting Cheyennes. Norman, Oklahoma: University of Oklahoma Press. OCLC 419857.
- Griske, Michael, ed. (2005). The Diaries of John Hunton. Westminster, Maryland: Heritage Books. ISBN 978-0-7884-3804-2.
- Hardoff, Richard (2002) [1989]. The Custer Battle Casualties: Burials, Exhumations, and Reinterments. El Segundo, California: Upton and Sons. ISBN 978-0-912783-14-7.
- Heatwole, John L. (1998). The Burning: Sheridan's Devastation of the Shenandoah Valley. Charlottesville, Virginia: Rockbridge Publishing. ISBN 978-1-883522-18-6.
- Hofling, Charles K. (1985). Custer and the Little Big Horn: a psychobiographical inquiry. Detroit: Wayne State University Press. ISBN 978-0-8143-1814-0.
- Hoxie, Frederick E. (1995). Parading Through History: the Making of the Crow Nation in America, 1805–1935. Cambridge: Cambridge University Press. ISBN 978-0-521-48057-4.
- Johansen, Bruce E. (2013). Encyclopedia of the American Indian Movement. Santa Barbara, California: Greenwood. ISBN 978-1-4408-0317-8.
- Kappler, Charles J., ed. (1904). Indian Affairs. Laws and Treaties. Vol. II. Washington, DC: Government Printing Office. OCLC 894543543.
- Kellogg, Mark (1923). "Notes: May 17 to June 9, 1876, of the Little Bighorn Expedition". Contributions to the Historical Society of Montana. 9.
- Kidd, James Harvey (1908). Personal Recollections of a Cavalryman With Custer's Michigan Cavalry Brigade in the Civil War. Ionia, Michigan: The Sentinel Press. OCLC 3666977.
- Longstreet, James (1908). From Manassas to Appomattox: Memoirs of the Civil War in America (2nd ed.). Philadelphia: J.B. Lippincott. OCLC 8295612.
- Marshall, Joseph M. III (2007). The Day the World Ended at Little Bighorn: A Lakota History. New York: Viking Press. ISBN 978-0-670-03853-4.
- Matthiessen, Peter (1991). In the Spirit of Crazy Horse. New York: Viking. ISBN 978-0-670-83617-8.
- Merington, Marguerite, ed. (1950). The Custer Story: The Life and Intimate Letters of General Custer and his Wife Elizabeth. New York: Devin-Adair. OCLC 1027056.
- Michno, Gregory F. (1997). Lakota Noon: The Indian Narrative of Custer's Defeat. Missoula, Montana: Mountain Press Publishing Company. ISBN 978-0-87842-356-9.
- Miles, Nelson A. (1992) [1896]. Personal recollections and observations of General Nelson A. Miles embracing a brief view of the Civil War, or, From New England to the Golden Gate : and the story of his Indian campaigns, with comments on the exploration, development and progress of our great western empire. Vol. 2. Lincoln, Nebraska: University of Nebraska Press. ISBN 978-0-8032-8181-3.
- Miller, David Humphreys (1985) [1957]. Custer's Fall: The Indian Side of the Story. Lincoln, Nebraska: University of Nebraska Press. ISBN 978-0-8032-3098-9.
- Miller, William E. (1888). "The Cavalry Battle near Gettysburg". In Johnson, Robert Underwood; Buel, Clarence Clough (eds.). Battles and Leaders of the Civil War. Vol. 3. New York: The Century Company. OCLC 2048818.
- Mills, David (2022). "George A. Custer". In Jennings, John M.; Steele, Chuck (eds.). The Worst Military Leaders in History. London: Reaktion Books. ISBN 978-1-78914-583-0.
- Monaghan, Leila (Autumn 2017). "Cheyenne and Lakota Women at the Battle of the Little Bighorn". Montana: The Magazine of Western History. 67 (3).
- Nevin, David (1973). The Old West: Soldiers. New York: Time-Life Books.
- O'Neill, Thomas (1991). Passing Into Legend: the Death of Custer. Brooklyn, New York: Arrow and Trooper. OCLC 681919492.
- Philbrick, Nathaniel (2010). The Last Stand: Custer, Sitting Bull, and the Battle of the Little Bighorn. New York: Viking. ISBN 978-0-670-02172-7.
- Ravage, John W. (1997). Black pioneers: images of the Black experience on the North American frontier. Salt Lake City: University of Utah Press. ISBN 978-0-87480-546-8.
- Rawle, William Brooke (1878). The Right flank at Gettysburg. Philadelphia: McLaughlin Brothers. OCLC 6243282.
- Richter, William L. (Summer 1985). "It is Best to Go Strong-Armed: Army Occupation of Texas, 1865–66". Arizona and the West. 27 (2).
- Robbins, James S. (2006). Last in their Class: Custer, Pickett and the Goats of West Point. New York: Encounter Books. ISBN 978-1-59403-142-7.
- Schultz, Duane (2010). Custer: lessons in leadership. New York: St. Martin's Press. ISBN 978-0-230-11424-1.
- Slotkin, Richard (1985). The Fatal Environment: The Myth of the Frontier in the Age of Industrialization, 1800–1890. New York: Atheneum. ISBN 978-0-689-11410-6.
- Smalley, Vern (2005). More Little Bighorn Mysteries: issues concerning the approach to and conduct of the Battle of the Little Bighorn. Bozeman, Montana: Little Buffalo Press. ISBN 978-0-9708549-2-6.
- Stewart, Edgar I. (1980) [1955]. Custer's Luck. Norman, Oklahoma: University of Oklahoma Press. ISBN 978-0-8061-0321-1. OCLC 32031819.
- Tagg, Larry (1998). The Generals Of Gettysburg: Appraisal Of The Leaders Of America's Greatest Battle. Campbell, California: Savas Publishing. ISBN 978-1-882810-30-7.
- Urwin, Gregory J. W. (1983). Custer Victorious: The Civil War Battles of General George Armstrong Custer. Lincoln, Nebraska: University of Nebraska Press. ISBN 978-0-8032-9556-8.
- Utley, Robert M. (2001). Cavalier in Buckskin: George Armstrong Custer and the Western Military Frontier (Revised ed.). Norman, Oklahoma: University of Oklahoma Press. ISBN 978-0-8061-3387-4.
- Wagner, Glendolin D. (1989) [1934]. Old Neutriment. Lincoln, Nebraska: University of Nebraska Press. ISBN 978-0-8032-9725-8.
- Warner, Ezra J. (1992) [1964]. Generals in Blue: Lives of the Union Commanders. Baton Rouge: Louisiana State University Press. ISBN 978-0-8071-0822-2.
- Welch, James; Stekler, Paul (2007) [1994]. Killing Custer: The Battle of Little Bighorn and the Fate of the Plains Indians. New York: W.W. Norton & Company. ISBN 978-0-393-32939-1.
- Wengert, James, ed. (1987). The Custer Dispatches. Manhattan, Kansas: Sunflower University Press. ISBN 978-0-89126-165-0.
- Wert, Jeffry D. (1996). Custer: The Controversial Life of George Armstrong Custer. New York: Simon & Schuster. ISBN 978-0-684-81043-0.
- Windolph, Charles; Hunt, Frazier; Hunt, Robert (1987) [1954]. I Fought with Custer: The Story of Sergeant Windolph, Last Survivor of the Battle of the Little Big Horn as told to Frazier and Robert Hunt. Lincoln, Nebraska: University of Nebraska Press. ISBN 978-0-8032-4746-8.
- Wittenberg, Eric J., ed. (2001). At Custer's Side: The Civil War Writings of James Harvey Kidd. Kent, Ohio: Kent State University Press. ISBN 978-0-87338-687-6.
