= David Humphreys Miller =

American painter

- Born: June 8, 1918
- Died: August 21, 1992 (aged 74)

David Humphreys Miller (June 8, 1918 – August 21, 1992) was an American artist, author, and film advisor who specialized in the culture of the northern Plains Indians. He was most notable for painting his 72 portraits of the survivors of the Battle of the Little Bighorn. In addition to his portraiture, he was also featured as a technical advisor on Native American culture for the films Cheyenne Autumn, How the West was Won, and the TV show Daniel Boone. Miller also wrote several books on Indian history. In 1948, he arranged the last meeting of the Bighorn survivors at the dedication of the Crazy Horse Memorial.

== Biography ==
Miller was born in Van Wert, Ohio, into a family of artists. He spent most of his childhood sketching and painting to develop his artistic talent. At age 16 with the aid of a translator, he first visited the Pine Ridge Indian Reservation in South Dakota and began interviewing the remaining survivors of the Battle of Little Bighorn, most of whom were over 70 years old. Most of them had never before conveyed their stories to a white man. As the Indian warriors were a majority of the battle survivors, these assorted interviews proved very important to later historical study of Custer's fall. He went on to study art at the University of Michigan, New York University, and at the Grand Central School of Art under Harvey Dunn. He also worked privately with Winold Reiss, continuing his work on the Bighorn survivors with his family's blessing during the summer. In 1942, he went into service for the 14th Air Corps in China during World War II. By the time of his return to the United States, there were only 20 living survivors of the battle. Furthering his study of the Plains peoples, Miller learned 14 Indian languages, including sign languages, and was adopted into 16 separate Indian families. Eventually, he was given the name Chief Iron White Man by Black Elk, in honor of the Oglala Sioux medicine man who had been at Little Bighorn. He later served as a technical advisor for 25 "Western" films. A good friend of Korczak Ziolkowski, Miller organized the last reunion of the remaining 8 Bighorn survivors on June 3, 1948, at the dedication of the Crazy Horse Memorial. In 1971, he wrote an extensive article on the recollections of the Custer survivors for American Heritage magazine. In his later years, Miller and his wife, Jan, lived in Rancho Santa Fe, California, where he continued to paint and write until his death in 1992.

== Works ==
Miller's most prominent and historically significant works were his 72 portraits of Custer survivors, which began with his painting of Chief Henry Oscar One Bull in 1935, and were completed in 1942. Most of his portraits were painted on flat, white acrylic. He took special care to precisely recreate native gear, clothing, and weaponry. In 1972, his works won the Western Heritage Award from National Cowboy Hall of Fame. His other works included the mural commissions of Mount Rushmore, and at the Citadel, Charleston, South Carolina. His writings included the books Custer's Fall: The Indian Side of the Story (1957), and Ghost Dance (1959).
