= Battle of Pease Bottom =

Coordinates: 46.17°N 107.47°W

- Part of the Yellowstone Expedition of 1873
Date	August 11, 1873
Location	present-day Treasure County, Montana, U.S. territory since May 7, 1868
Result	United States victory

Belligerents
United States	Lakota Sioux

Commanders and leaders
(United States) George A. Custer	Sitting Bull

Strength
~500 soldiers	~400 warriors

Casualties and losses
4 killed, 4 wounded	unknown

The Battle of Pease Bottom, also called the Battle of the Bighorn River, was a conflict between the United States Army and the Sioux on August 11, 1873, along the Yellowstone River opposite the mouth of the Bighorn River near present-day Custer, Montana. The main combatants were units of the 7th U.S. Cavalry under Lieutenant Colonel George Armstrong Custer, and Native Americans from the village of the Hunkpapa medicine man, Sitting Bull, many of whom would clash with Custer again approximately three years later at the Battle of the Little Big Horn in the Crow Indian Reservation.

== Short history of the battlefield ==
The site of the future battlefield came to be a locality in a treaty territory for the first time in 1851. The Treaty of Fort Laramie describes the area as Crow Indian country. The Lakota tribe acknowledged this. Nearly all the battles in the mid-1860s and the 1870s "between the army and the Dakota Lakota, North Dakota were on lands those Indians had taken from other tribes since 1851." When the Crows agreed to settle on a smaller reservation on May 7, 1868, all the 1851 Crow treaty land north of the Yellowstone - including the future Pease Bottom - became U.S. territory.

== Participants ==
=== U.S. Army forces ===
Custer and ten companies of the 7th Cavalry were part of the Yellowstone Expedition of 1873, a military column commanded by Colonel David S. Stanley accompanying the Northern Pacific Railway survey party surveying the north side of the Yellowstone River west of the Powder River in eastern Montana. Stanley's column consisted of a 1,300 man force of cavalry, infantry, and two artillery pieces (3" ordnance rifles). It traveled with 275 mule-drawn wagons and 353 civilians involved in the survey. Twenty-seven Indian and mixed-blood scouts supported the column.

Just a week before, the army had been under Lakota attack in U.S. territory at Honsinger Bluff.

The Battle of Pease Bottom was fought primarily by 8 companies of the 7th Cavalry under command of General Custer, numbering roughly 450 men.

=== Native American forces ===
The Native American forces were from the Sitting Bull's village, estimated at anywhere from 400 to 500 lodges. It included Hunkpapa Sioux under Gall accompanied by the warchief Rain in the Face, Oglala Sioux under Crazy Horse, and Miniconjou and Cheyenne. The warrior force was estimated at between 800 and 1000 warriors.

== Battle ==
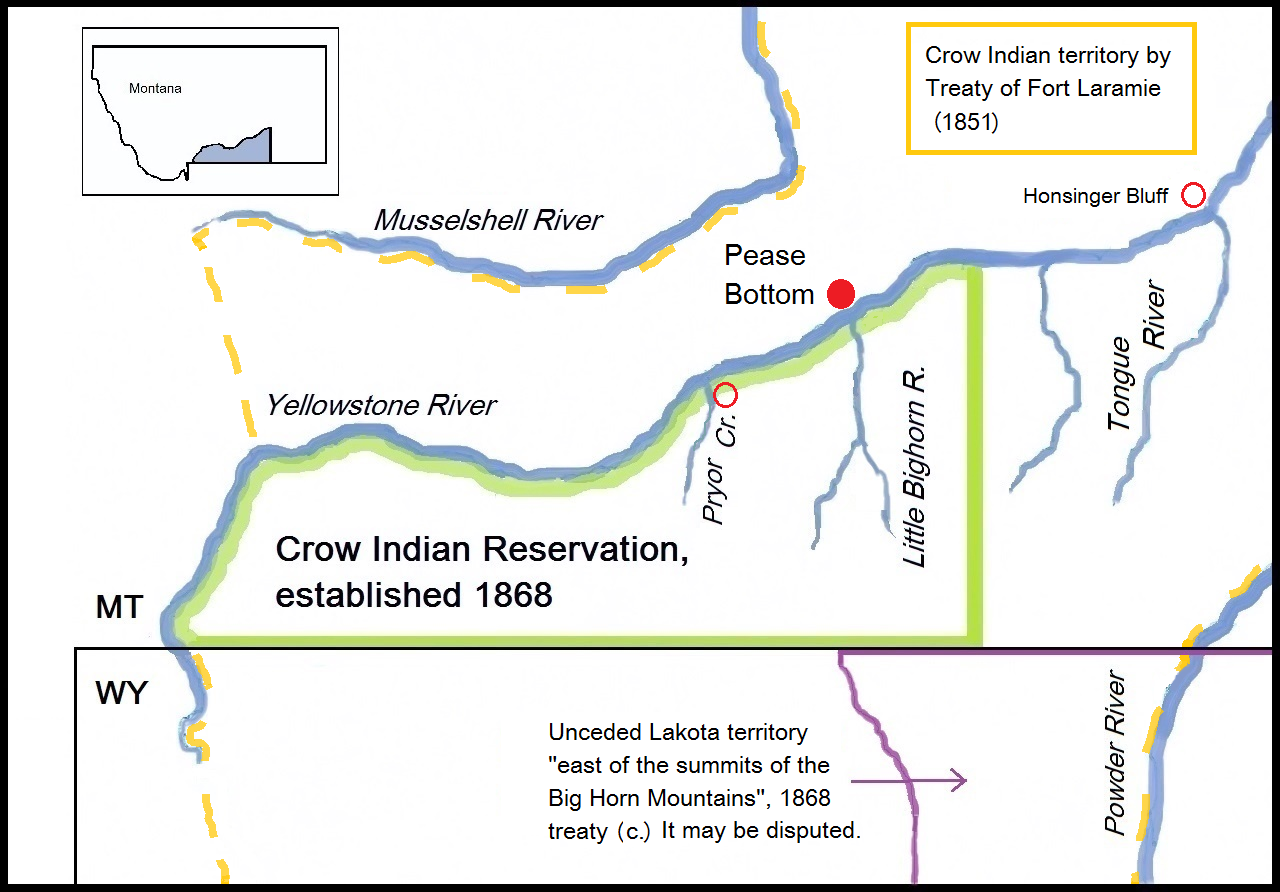
Map with the battlefield of Pease Bottom (1873), Montana, and relevant Indian territories. The site of the battlefield had been U.S. territory for five years. The conflict between the United States and the buffalo seeking Lakotas was a collision between two growing empires. Most battles took place in areas the Lakotas recently had taken from the Crows. Between the battles of Honsinger Bluff (August 4) and Pease Bottom (August 11), a force of Lakotas attacked a Crow camp on Pryor Creek in the Crow reservation in a day long battle. Note that the line for the 1868 unceded Lakota territory "east of the summits of the Big Horn Mountains" may be disputed.

On the morning of August 11, 1873, Custer was encamped with a portion of the 1873 Yellowstone Expedition (Eight companies of the 7th Cavalry) along the north side of the Yellowstone River at what was later known as Pease Bottom near present-day Custer, Montana. In the early morning hours warriors from the village of Sitting Bull started firing at Custer's camp from across the river, and by dawn skirmishing had broken out in several locations. After shooting at least 3 warriors across the river, Private John Tuttle of Company E, 7th Cavalry was killed in the morning fighting, warriors then crossed the Yellowstone River above and below the camp of the 7th Cavalry and attacked Custer's troops. The 7th Cavalry successfully defended their rear, front and center from this attack, then counter-attacked with a charge, breaking the warrior positions and driving the warriors eight or more miles from the battlefield. At about the same time, Colonel Stanley's column appeared in the distance several miles away and hurried to support the engagement. During the battle Second Lieutenant Charles Braden of the 7th Cavalry was critically wounded, along with three other Privates of the same regiment. Braden's thigh was shattered by an Indian bullet and he remained on permanent sick leave until his retirement from the Army in 1878. He would posthumously be awarded the Distinguished Service Cross in 1925 for his actions during the battle. At least one army horse was wounded during the engagement. Indian losses were unknown, however, estimates from Custer's post-battle report claim "their losses in killed and wounded were beyond all proportion to that which they were enabled to inflict on us, our losses being one officer badly wounded, four men killed, and three wounded. Careful investigation justifies the statement that including both day's battles, the Indian losses will number forty warriors, while their wounded on the opposite bank of the river may increase this number."

== Order of battle ==
=== United States Army ===
United States Army, Lieutenant Colonel George A. Custer, 7th United States Cavalry Regiment, Commanding.

- 7th U. S. Cavalry, Companies A, B, C, E, F, G, H, K, L and M: Lieutenant Colonel George A. Custer
- Artillery Section of (two) 3-inch ordnance rifles (Cannons): Second Lieutenant John McA. Webster, 22nd Infantry

Yellowstone Expedition	Regiment	Companies and Others
Lieutenant Colonel George A. Custer, commanding.	7th Cavalry Lieutenant Colonel George A. Custer Adjutant First Lieutenant William Weiner Cooke	Company A: Captain Myles Moylan, First Lieutenant Thomas Ward Custer; Company B: Second Lieutenant Charles Varnum; Company C: First Lieutenant James Calhoun, Second Lieutenant Henry Moore Harrington; Company E: Company F: Captain George Wilhelmus Mancius Yates; Company G: Second Lieutenant George Daniel Wallace; Company H: Captain Frederick William Benteen; Company K: Company L: Second Lieutenant Charles Braden (Wounded); Company M:
Lieutenant Colonel George A. Custer, commanding.	20th Infantry Second Lieutenant John McA. Webster	Company E: Second Lieutenant John McA. Webster

=== Native Americans ===
- Lakota Sioux: Sitting Bull.

== See also ==
- Sitting Bull
- George Armstrong Custer
