= Arikara scouts =

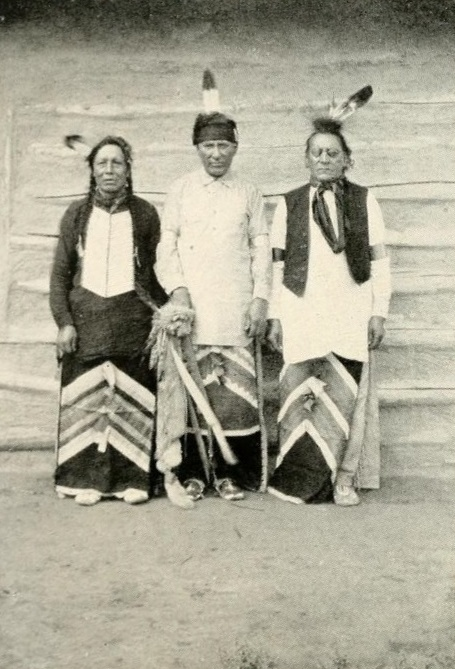
- Former Arikara scouts in the U.S. Army: Red Star (left), Boy Chief (center) and Red Bear (right)
- Active: 1868 – 1881
- Allegiance: United States
- Branch: United States Army
- Type: Indian scouts
- Garrison/HQ: Fort Stevenson Fort McKeen Fort Abraham Lincoln (former Fort McKeen)
- Engagements: Lakota attacks near Fort McKeen Yellowstone Expedition of 1873: Battle of Honsinger Bluff; Battle of Pease Bottom; Great Sioux War: Battle of the Little Big Horn

Commanders
- Notable commanders: George A. Custer, George Crook, Charles A. Varnum, Alfred Terry

Arikara scouts were enlisted men from the Arikara Nation serving in the U.S. Army at different frontier posts in present-day North Dakota from 1868 to 1881. The enlistment period was six months with re-enlistment possible. Each scout received a uniform, firearm and drew rations. Scout duties ranged from carrying mail between commands to tracking down traditional enemies perceived as hostile by the Army in far ranging military campaigns. Detailed to secure the horses in located enemy camps, the scouts were often the first to engage in battle. The Arikara took part when the Army protected survey crews in the Yellowstone area in the early 1870s. They participated in the Great Sioux War of 1876 and developed into Colonel George Armstrong Custer's "… most loyal and permanent scouts …".

Nearly 150 Arikara enlisted at different times from 1868 until the end of the Indian Wars in the area. They served "bravely and honorably". The experience of the scouts motivates some present-day Arikara people to carry on the tradition and enter military service.

== History of service ==
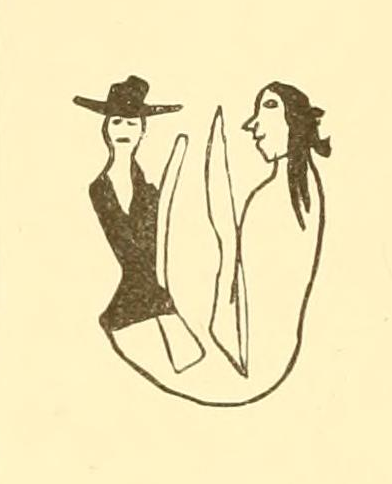
The joint Army and Sioux attack on two Arikara villages in South Dakota in 1823 (the Leavenworth Site) is recorded in a number of Sioux winter counts

There are abundant historical examples of Native Americans joining with whites to fight against other tribes. On the northern plains, 700 Yankton, Yanktonai and Lakota people were the first to aid the U.S. Army in an attack on two adjoining Arikara villages in South Dakota in 1823. In 1868, Osage scouts found Cheyenne chief Black Kettle's camp, leading to the Battle of Washita River.

To commanders of the frontier Army, the need for native scouts with special skills not easily found among ordinary soldiers was pressing. On August 1, 1866, the "Act to increase and fix the Military Peace Establishment of the United States" came into force, and the Army could now legally enlist a certain number of native scouts, but no more than 1,000 nationwide at any time, as long as needed.

== Enlistment and the life at the garrisons ==
In May 1868, the first Arikara enlisted at Fort Stevenson, to duplicate the success of the Pawnee scouts already enlisted in Nebraska. Chief Big John was in charge at Fort Stevenson. All recruits came from the tribal police force of chief White Shield. Initially armed with infantry rifles, they soon received Spencer repeating carbines in addition to other equipment. They were paid 40 cents a day for the use of their own horse.

Additional members later enlisted at Fort McKeen down river. Strikes Two, Pretty Crow, Elk Tongue and other Arikara made the tour in three days in bull boats. The Army provided clothing including under-clothes, a flannel shirt, footwear and a plumed hat. Some scouts lived with their immediate family at the scout quarters of the garrison. Arikara like Forked Horn and Black Fox served as cooks for the scout unit. They received pay in the amount of 16 dollars per month disbursed every second month and scouts received an addition 12 dollars per month if they rode their own horse.

== Service history ==
=== At Fort McKeen ===
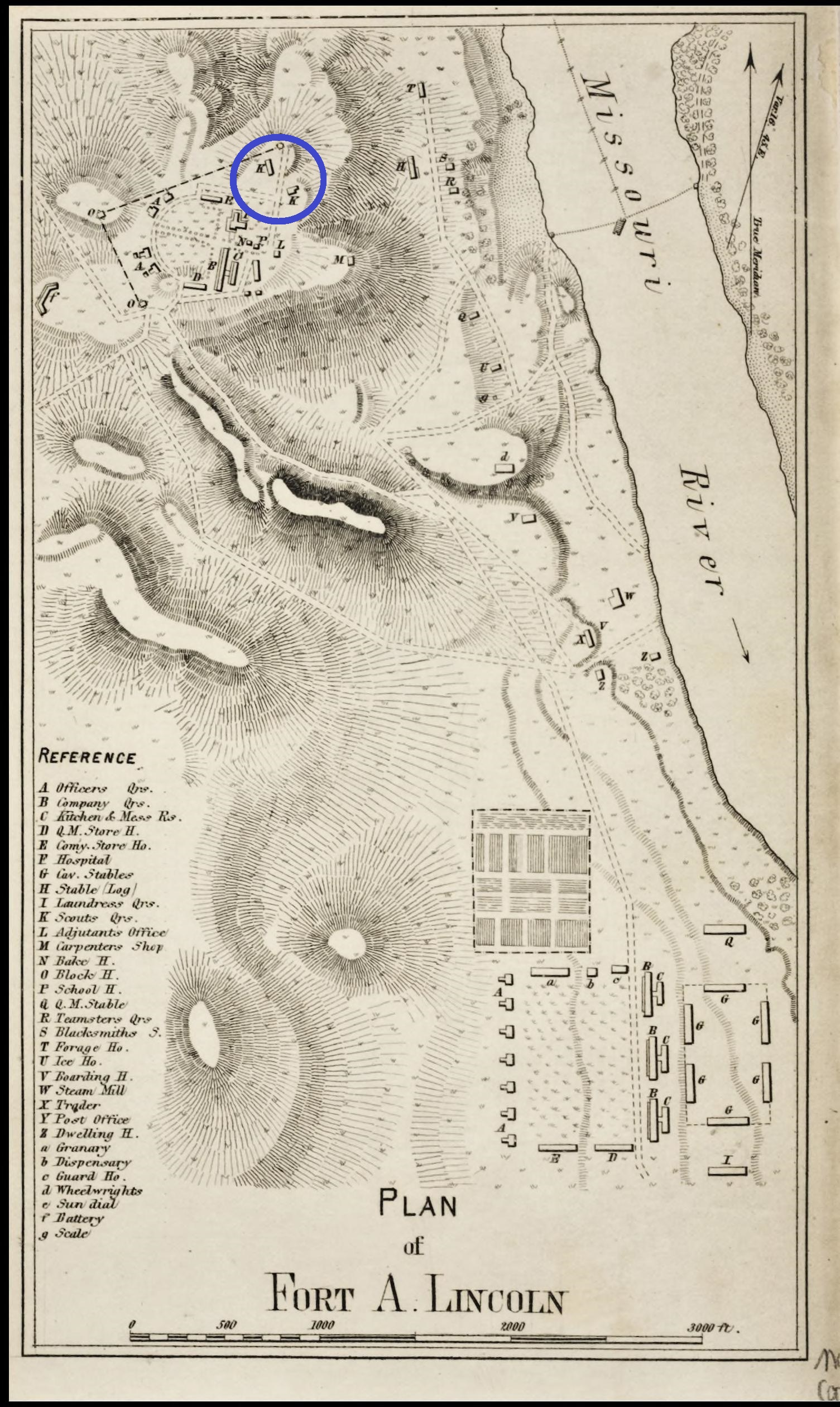
Bull Neck and Paint travelled from Like-a-Fishhook Village to Fort McKeen by bull boat and enlisted there. Later, the post was enlarged some miles southward on a flat terrain and renamed Fort Abraham Lincoln. The scouts had their own quarters (marked with blue) at "Fort Lincoln on the hill"

Scouts at Fort McKeen, near the confluence of Heart and Missouri Rivers, fought the Lakota in 1872. Although the latter had agreed "not to attack any persons" after the signing of the Fort Laramie treaty of 1868. On August 26, more than 100 Sioux attacked seven soldiers and two scouts outside the fort and the Arikara there were killed. The scouts were again involved in fights with the Lakota near the garrison on October 2, October 14 (with eight scouts taking part) and November 3, with the apparent primary target being the Arikara scouts themselves. Due to the heavy losses, some scouts left the service. However, Arikara second chief Son of the Star still encouraged the men to enlist.

=== Protecting surveying crews ===
Arikara scouts formed part of the forces assigned to protect crews surveying a route from Bismarck, North Dakota to Bozeman, Montana for the Northern Pacific Railway in 1873. The Dakota had attacked crew members and soldiers the year prior, despite treaty provisions stipulating that they would allow rail construction "not passing over their reservation".

Bloody Knife served as "scout and guide" to the leader of the 7th Cavalry Regiment, George A. Custer. Bloody Knife took part in the defense, when the Cavalry came under attack in U.S. territory north of the Yellowstone near the mouth of the Tongue on August 4. Again on August 11, the Army and the scouts were attacked by hundreds of Lakota, with the tribesmen shouting at one another through breaks in rifle fire.

=== Black Hills Expedition, 1874 ===
In the summer of 1874, Arikara scouts guided an exploring and gold seeking expedition from Fort Abraham Lincoln (formerly Fort McKeen, moved further to the south) to the Black Hills in the Great Sioux Reservation. Because the Black Hills are considered sacred to the Lakota, and were barred from white encroachment by treaty, many foresaw a Lakota attempt to halt the expedition. Accordingly, it was protected by both Infantry and Cavalry. George A. Custer was in command.

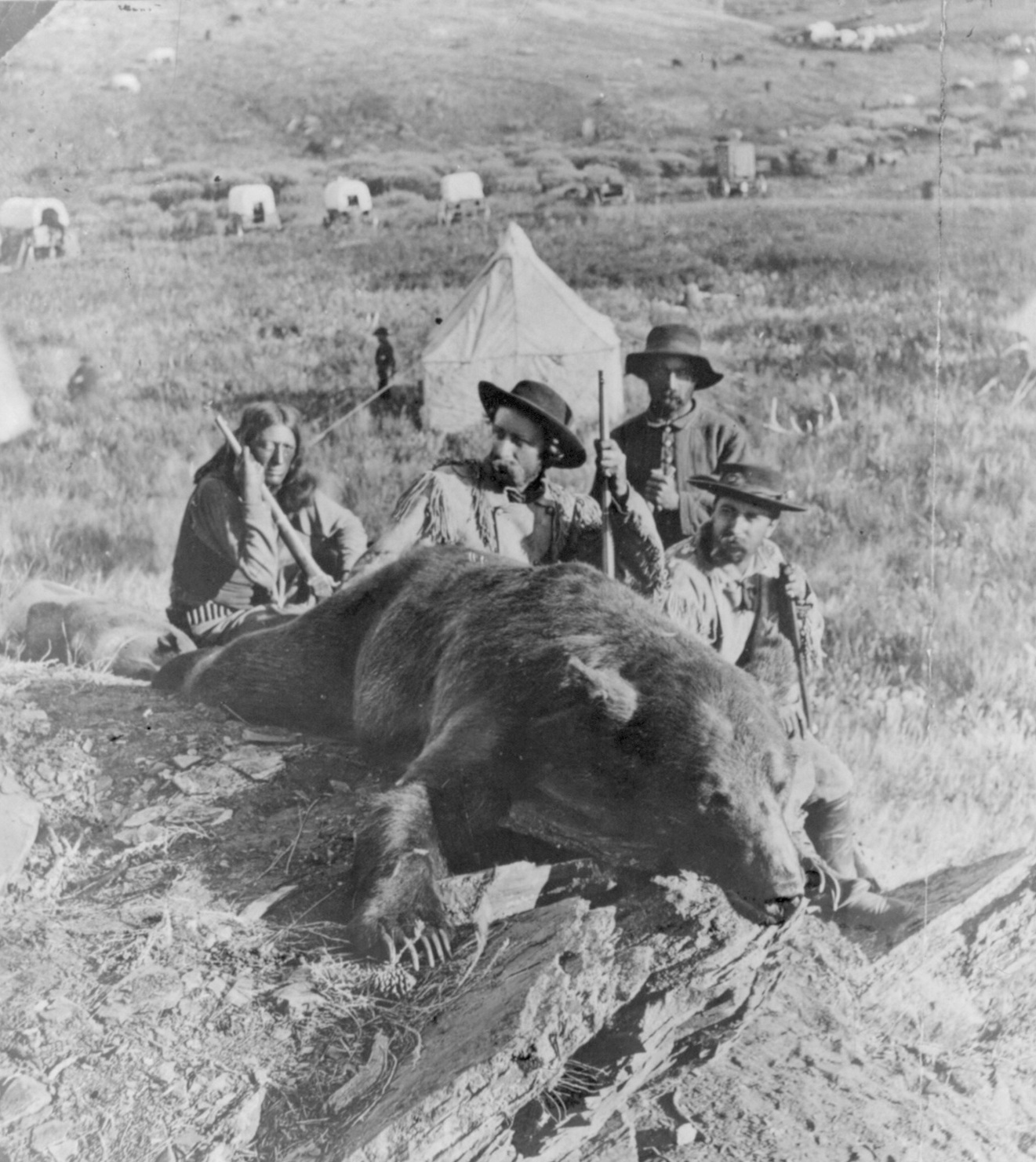
Bloody Knife, Custer and Captain William Ludlow with a killed bear. All three claimed to have shot it. Custer received credit

The expedition was delayed from the outset. News reached Fort Abraham Lincoln of a large Lakota war party on its way to attack Like-a-Fishhook Village almost 100 miles outside the Great Sioux Reservation, and General Philip Sheridan made stopping this a priority. Although he ordered Custer to protect the Arikara "same as white settlers", the Lakota attacked on June 13 and killed five men along with the Mandan Foolish Head. The later U.S. scout Running Wolf gives the names of the killed Arikara as Bear-Turning, Little Crow, Standing Bear, Black Shirt and the former U.S. scout Bear-Going-in-Woods.

The expedition set off with a number of young Santee Sioux serving as scouts beside the Arikara, and Bloody Knife along with Lean Bear taking lead roles. Some of the 22 members in the scout group, as recalled by Strikes Two and Bear's Belly, were Enemy Heart, Young Hawk, Goose and Red Horse. The scouts rode ahead of the columns and guarded their flanks, so that they were "covering much country".

One morning the Arikara discovered a small hunting camp of Oglala Lakota in the Black Hills. All the Arikara scouts rode up and struck a single man in the village with their horse whip. Cautiously, a few returning hunters visited the camp of the whites. Upon their return, a mounted Lakota tried to take a Santee scout's firearm, but failed and fled, with he or his horse hit by a shot. Neither the hunter nor the fleeing camp was overtaken by the pursuing Arikara. An old Lakota was held captive for a few days and then released. Accounts of these events differ to some degree.

The later Indian enthusiast George Bird Grinnell was invited to join the Black Hills expedition as a collector of birds and fossils. Grinnell rode together with Luther H. North, brother to the leader of the Pawnee scouts. "Lute talked Pawnee fluently, and this was a password to the good graces of all the Rees [Arikara]." Once, a scout went a long way round to offer Grinnell and North water, and when in camp, some scouts came to watch Grinnell skinning the bird specimens he had collected, and discuss the day's events.

=== Great Sioux War, 1876 ===
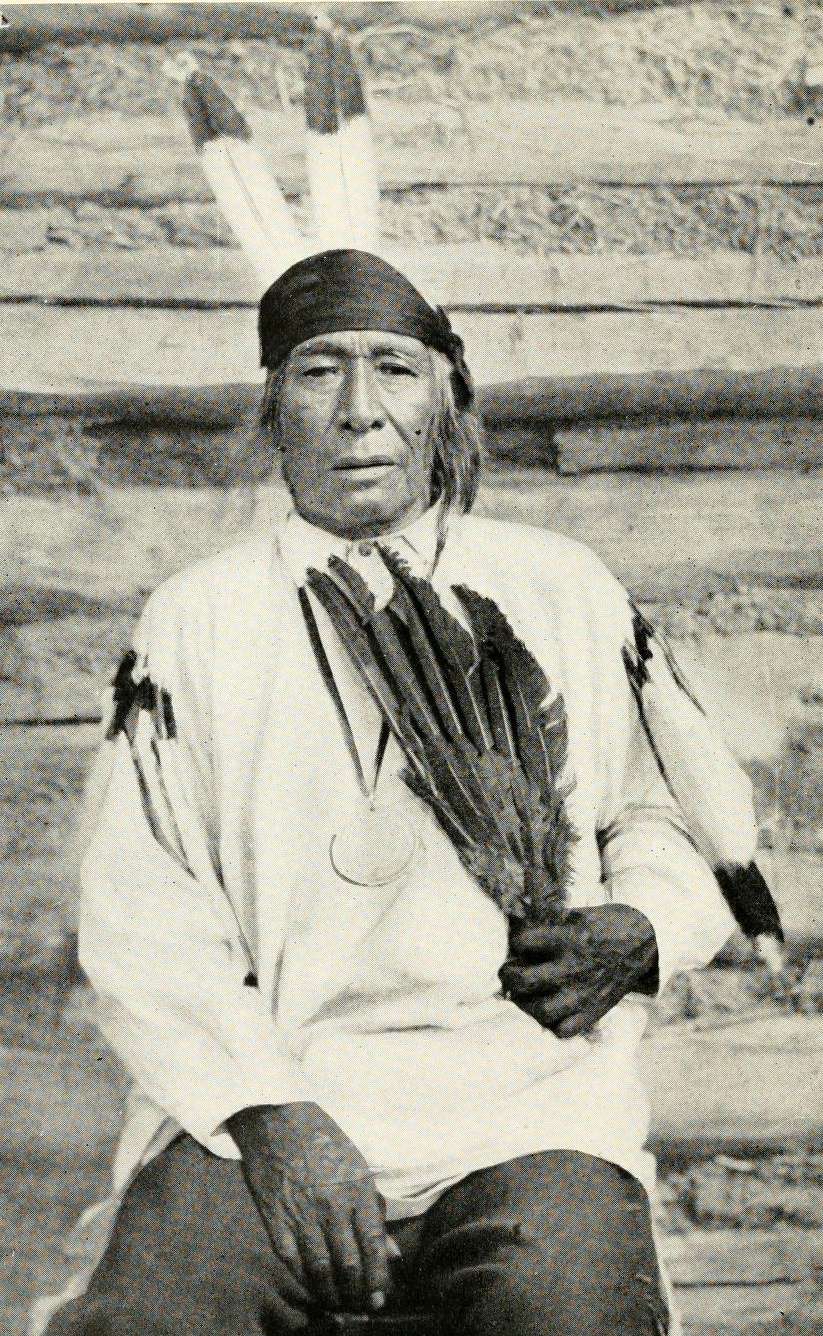
Arikara Indian Strikes Two enlisted as scout at Fort McKeen in 1872. This photograph was likely taken at Fort Berthold Indian Reservation in August 1912, when he and other Arikara scouts told their story to Orin Grant Libby from the State Historical Society of North Dakota

In 1876, the second chief Son of the Star informed a number of Arikara in the Fort Berthold Indian Reservation about an expedition against some Sioux commanded by "Long Hair" or Custer. The father of Young Hawk, Forked Horn, enlisted immediately and said his son would go as well. They started from Fort Berthold and camped over night at Fort Stevenson. Big John, an Arikara scout, was in charge of the party. The same man (already referred to) was in charge at Fort Stevenson. Twenty-three additional Arikara enlisted under the guidance of Big John. A few days later, Red Bear joined after being scolded by Son of the Star. During the Little Bighorn campaign, the 38 Arikara engaged there worked to protect base camps, and were dispatched as riders, forming a part of the front battle line.

The scouts were the first to parade at the departure from Fort Abraham Lincoln. On the way westward to the Yellowstone, scouts on high hills guarded the camp throughout the night, while those in camp were always near the tent of Custer, who would occasionally visit with them. The scouts served as mail carriers between the camp and the fort, and in addition to letters to the soldiers, Red Bear brought moccasins for the scouts from their wives at the garrison. Skilled hunters like Strikes Two and Goose each earned more than 100 dollars during the expedition by selling specific cuts of game at fixed prices to the soldiers.

Slowed by the advance of the accompanying wagon train, the Cavalry separated from it at the confluence of the Yellowstone and the Powder rivers. The infantry, along with scouts such as Tall Bear and Black Porcupine, guarded the wagons. Realizing that a large number of Lakota were somewhere in the Yellowstone area, the field scouts received orders to retreat to this position in case of defeat. On June 21, a scouting party returned to camp with news of a large Lakota trail near the Rosebud River. Now trailing the enemy, the scouts sang their sacred songs, seemingly encouraged by Custer. "Custer had a heart like an Indian…" declared Red Star, "…if we ever left out one thing in our ceremonies he always suggested it to us."

Six Crow Indian scouts joined the Cavalry for similar reasons as the Arikara. The area ahead was traditionally Crow territory, and acknowledged as such by the Lakota in the 1851 Treaty of Fort Laramie. Since then, the Lakota had taken over the eastern Crow land, including more recently the Bighorn River area in the Crow Indian Reservation, created on May 7, 1868. By now, they were "… menacing and often raiding the Crow in their reservation camps."

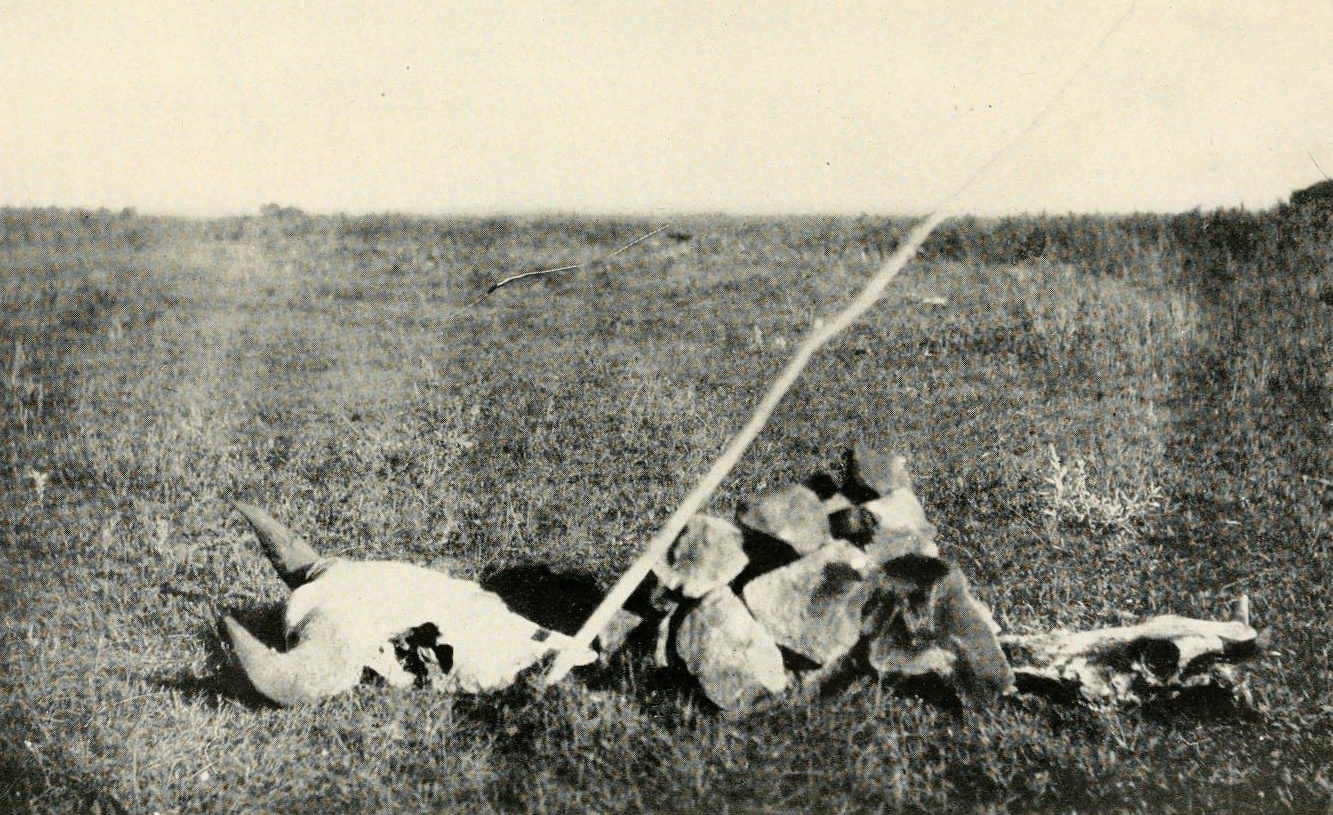
A reconstruction of an Sign left by the Dakotas on their trail

First sergeant Bobtailed-Bull advanced up the Rosebud on one side of the river with a group of scouts, while Red Bear and Soldier directed another group on the opposite bank. Close behind came the mounted troops. By the end of the day, they came to the place of a recently moved Lakota camp. Signs and drawings left by the Lakota were understood to show Lakota confidence in case of battle. Bull and Red Star, along with other Arikara followed four Crow scouts in an advanced search. Lieutenant Charles Varnum joined as Army leader of the scouts, along with Charley Reynolds. The Crow guided the whole party, being in their own territory.

The slower main body rested at the forks of the Rosebud. Custer consulted the remaining scouts and assigned their role in a planned attack to drive away as many enemy horses as possible. The group again mounted and rode throughout the night. During a quick breakfast Bull and Red Star arrived with news of a located enemy camp.

Custer followed Red Star to a nearby hill where the Crow scouts had discovered the Lakota camp in the distance. Custer preferred to wait and station his troops around the camp during the night but the Crow convinced Custer that the Lakota were well aware of the presence of the Army and Custer readied his troops for a quick attack. The 22 Arikara present assembled, and the experienced warriors encouraged the young scouts. They rode ahead, found a lone Lakota tipi and counted coup on it. Here they were overtaken by the mounted troops and reproached by Custer for going against his orders to disperse the enemy horses and render them on foot prior to a Cavalry charge.

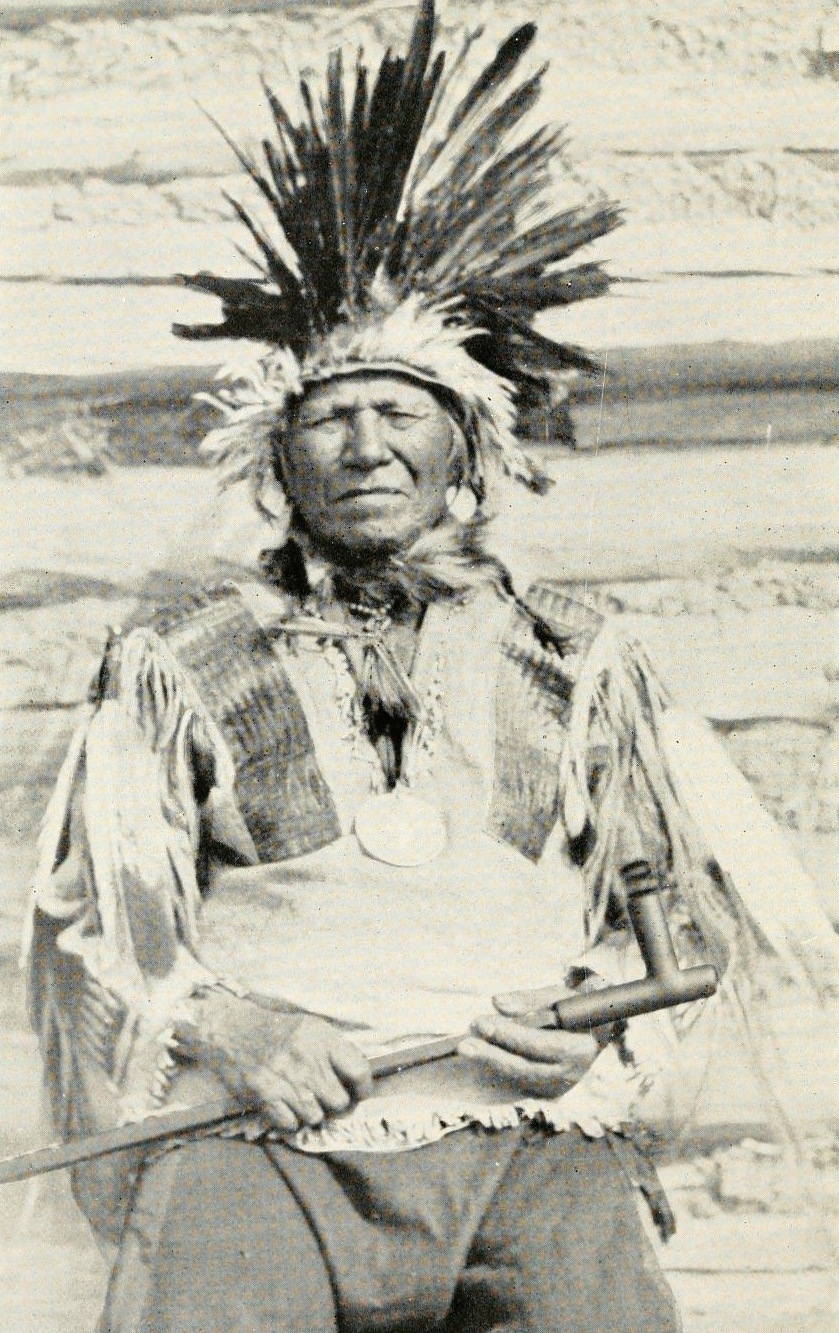
Soldier was born in the start of the 1830s. During a hunting expedition around 1854, he received a chest wound in a battle with the Sioux near present-day Dickinson. He was a long time scout at Fort Stevenson. In 1876, he departed Fort Abraham Lincoln together with the rest of the scouts taking part in the Great Sioux War.

The best mounted scouts followed the fast moving Cavalry on the way to Little Bighorn River. They, along with Little Sioux, Red Bear and 11 scouts crossed the river south of the Lakota camp along with the troops under Major Reno. Red Star, Boy Chief and Strikes Two escaped with 28 Lakota horses.

When skirmishing began, both scouts and soldiers dismounted and formed a line. Bloody Knife joined, wearing a black handkerchief with blue stars given him by Custer, and informed Young Hawk and the other scouts that a number of horses had been taken from the enemy. Some were retaken by the Lakota later. The fight grew more intense. During a general retreat, a number of Arikara and two Crow took shelter in a thick grove on the east side of the river. Here, Goose was shot in the hand, while the Crow scout White Swan was wounded in both the hand and leg. Lakota attempts to drive the scouts out into the open failed, and Custer's attack further north drew the Lakota away.

The scouts left the thicket, and flying a white flag, headed for a hill where they could see the flag of the U.S. troops. They managed to reach Major Marcus Reno's forces, pursued by the returning Lakota. Here they received word that Bob-tailed Bull had been killed. Other scouts reached Reno's troops. A number stayed, while some drove around 40 captured horses towards the depot on the Powder River, as ordered in case of defeat.

As night fell, four scouts carrying a copy of the same message tried to break through the ring of Lakota surrounding Reno Hill, but were turned back. About noon the next day, the Lakota broke camp. Shortly after, some went down a ridge west of their abandoned location. Assuming them to be soldiers, Young Hawk and his father rode towards them. The two scouts returned to the hilltop and reported the location of the party. An officer told them, "Now let us go and look for Custer's body."

On the battlefield, a soldier directed the scouts to the dead body of an Arikara in a grove, possibly that of Bloody Knife. The body of Little Brave, who had also been killed was never found. Young Hawk led a pony with the wounded Goose on a travois to the steamboat Far West stationed at the mouth of the Little Bighorn River.

The first Arikara scouts reached the Infantry camp at the Powder. When they recounted what had happened, all the soldiers doubted them.

Some scouts continued carrying mail during the following days, while other worked to locate the scattering Lakota.

In September, General George Crook and his men were in dire need of supplies when they followed the trail of a Lakota camp southward to the Black Hills. Some of the five The Arikara accompanying Crook started on their way to Fort Abraham Lincoln with a message asking for relief, and carried the urgent telegram to its destination in only three days.

== Later ==
In 1889, the scouts paraded through the city of Bismarck on the 4th of July. They formed the United States Volunteer Indian Scouts in 1912. Despite promises to the contrary, most of them never received a pension. In memory of Custer, the old scouts composed and sang a song on Memorial Day in 1917. Some of the descendants of the scouts still sing the "Custer Song".

== See also ==
- Apache Scouts
- Black Seminole Scouts
- Crow scouts
- Navajo Scouts
- Pawnee Scouts
