= Yellowstone Expedition of 1873 =

US Army expedition to Dakota and Montana

- Part of the Sioux Wars
Date	June 20 – September 23, 1873
Location	Dakota Territory and Montana Territory
Result	United States victory

Belligerents
Lakota Sioux	United States

Commanders and leaders
Sitting Bull; Crazy Horse; Gall; Rain in the Face	(United States) David S. Stanley (United States) George A. Custer

Strength
~1,000 Warriors	1,530 Soldiers; 353 Civilians

Casualties and losses
4 killed, 12 wounded	11 killed, 4 wounded, 5 horses killed, ~90 mules killed

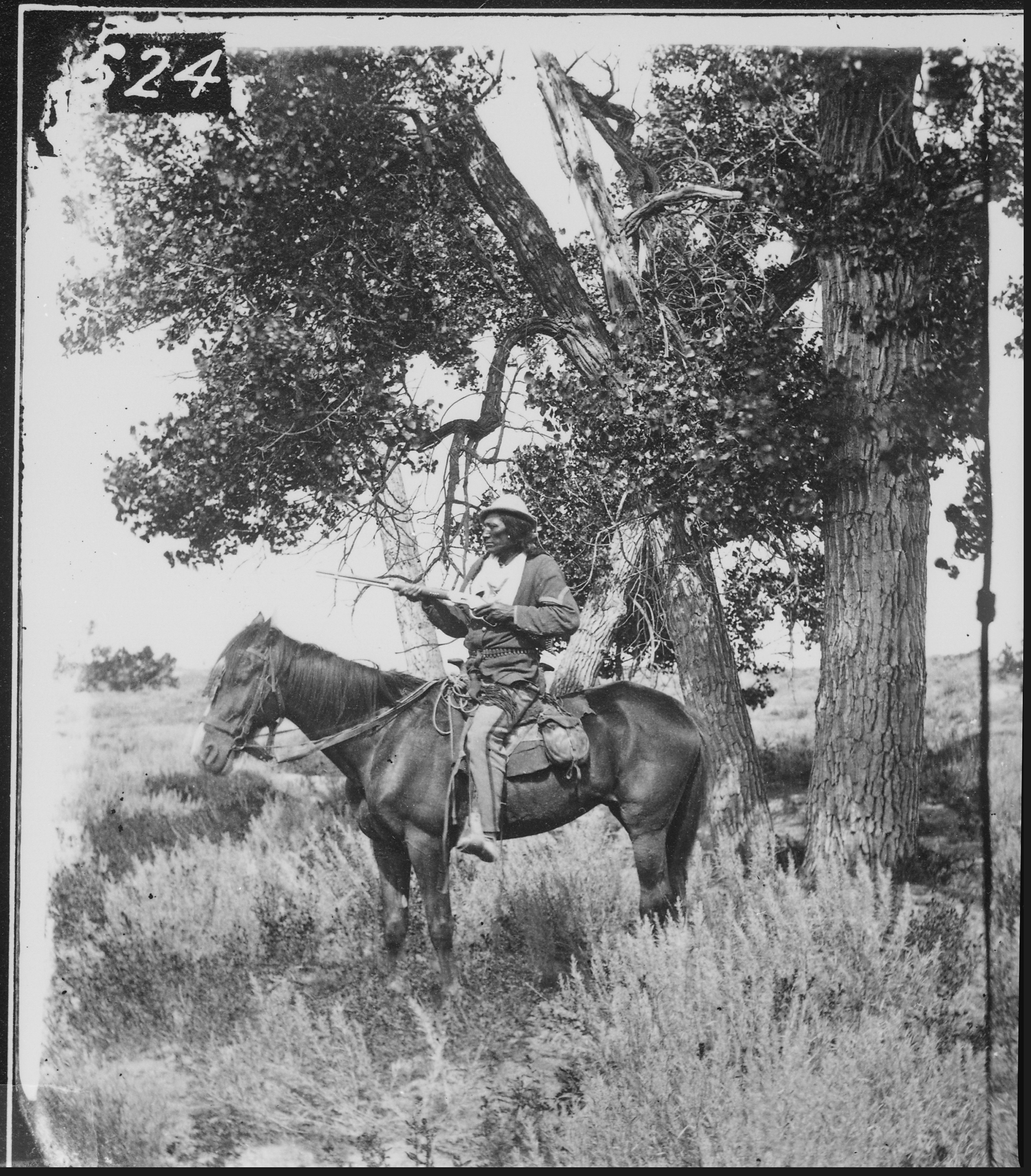
Bloody Knife, Custer's scout, on Yellowstone Expedition, 1873

The Yellowstone Expedition of 1873 was an expedition of the United States Army in the summer of 1873 in Dakota Territory and Montana Territory, to survey a route for the Northern Pacific Railroad along the Yellowstone River. The expedition was under the overall command of Colonel David S. Stanley, with Lieutenant Colonel George A. Custer second in command.

== Participants ==
=== U.S. Army forces ===
Custer and units of the 7th Cavalry were part of the military column commanded by Colonel David S. Stanley accompanying the 1873 Northern Pacific Railway survey party surveying the north side of the Yellowstone River west of the Powder River in eastern Montana. Stanley's column consisted of a 1,530 man force of cavalry, infantry, and two artillery pieces (3" rifled Rodman guns), and 60 days' rations. It traveled out of Dakota Territory in June, 1873 with the 1,530 soldiers, 275 mule-drawn wagons, 353 civilians involved in the survey, and 27 Indian and mixed-blood scouts supporting the column.

=== Native American forces ===
The Native American forces that fought against the expedition in Montana Territory were from the village of Sitting Bull, estimated at anywhere from 400 to 500 lodges with over 1000 Warriors. It included Hunkpapa Sioux under Gall accompanied by the warchief Rain in the Face, Oglala Sioux under Crazy Horse, and Miniconjou and Cheyenne.

== The Expedition Begins ==
The main expedition was ready and started from Fort Rice, Dakota Territory on June 20, 1873. The surveying party and six companies under Major Edwin F. Townsend, 9th Infantry had started four days earlier from Fort Abraham Lincoln on the Missouri River, being directed to travel west until the main command might overtake them. In the first seventeen days of marching it rained fourteen days, in some instances with three or four heavy rain-falls in twenty-four hours. After taking a day to cross the main command over the Heart River, Colonel Stanley received a report from Mr. Risser, the chief engineer, and Major Townsend, that on June 24, the surveying party and its escort had "been overtaken by a most furious hail-storm...in which men had barely escaped with their lives, and the animals stampeding on the march had broken up their wagons to such an extent as to completely cripple both engineers and escort." Stanley sent the remainder of the 7th Cavalry and the mechanic outfit ahead to the surveyors to help repair the damages, while the infantry stayed with the heavy wagon train. By July 1, the infantry and wagon train had crossed over the Muddy River, which was flooded approximately 60 feet wide, via a makeshift pontoon bridge of overturned wagon beds, designed by the chief commissary officer, Lieutenant P. H. Ray of the 8th Infantry. At this time Stanley sent 47 wagons back to Fort Rice for additional supplies. On July 5, the infantry escorting the wagons had caught up with the surveying party under Mr. Rosser, Major Townsend's Infantry detachment, and the 7th Cavalry under Lieutenant Colonel George A. Custer. The expedition pushed on, crossing the flooded Little Missouri River, and entering into Montana Territory, reaching the Yellowstone River, on July 13, 1873. Custer and two squadrons of cavalry then going across a rough trail, reached the mouth of Glendive Creek on the Yellowstone, there meeting the steamboat Key West, which had established a supply depot at that point. After Stanley reached the depot, he left two 7th Cavalry companies and one 17th Infantry company to guard it, and on July 26, had the Key West ferry troops and wagons over to the north bank of the Yellowstone. After traveling west, on August 1, Stanley's column met the Steamship Josephine under Captain Grant Marsh eight miles above the mouth of the Powder River. Captain William Ludlow of the engineers had brought the boat up with a supply of forage and some necessary clothing. That night the expedition had the first evidence of the presence of Indians, the camp guards firing on several during the night, and the trail of ten being plainly seen going up the valley the next morning, August 2. In marching up the left bank of the Yellowstone, an escort of one company of infantry and one of the 7th Cavalry took care of the surveying party, which aimed to follow the valley, while the wagon train had to take many detours, leaving the valley and crossing the plateaus where the river ran close the bluffs.

== Battle of Honsinger Bluff ==
On Sunday, August 4, 1873, Stanley's column camped near the mouth of Sunday Creek, a tributary to the Yellowstone on the northeasterly end of Yellowstone Hill in present-day Custer County, Montana. Early on the morning of August 4, 1873 the column moved up the northwest side of the hill along the south fork of Sunday Creek. Captain George W. Yates with a company of the 7th Cavalry accompanied the surveyors along the southeast side of the hill along the Yellowstone River. George Custer, with Companies A and B of the 7th Cavalry under the command of Captain Myles Moylan scouted to the west ahead of Stanley's column. Custer's group consisted of 86 enlisted men, 4 officers, and Indian scouts. Custer's brother, First Lieutenant Thomas Custer, and his brother-in-law, First Lieutenant James Calhoun, accompanied him.

Shots were exchanged with Sioux Warriors near the Yellowstone River early in the battle, and George Custer's men formed a skirmish line. A volley from the line distracted the pursuing Indians enough to halt the warriors' charge. Custer had Captain Moylan pull back his Company A to a wooded area previously occupied by Company A. After reaching the wooded area, the cavalrymen dismounted, forming a semicircular perimeter along a former channel of the Yellowstone River. The usual configuration for dismounted cavalry was every fourth man holding horses, however, due to the length of the semicircular perimeter, only every eighth man was detailed to hold horses. The bank of the dry channel served as a natural parapet.

The warrior's siege on the detachment of the 7th Cavalry continued for about three hours in reported 110 °F (43 °C) heat, when Custer's mounted soldiers burst from their wooded river position in a charge that scattered the Lakota Sioux forces, who fled upriver with Custer's men in pursuit. The soldiers pursued them for nearly four miles but were never able to close on them sufficiently to engage them.

== Battle of Pease Bottom ==
The Yellowstone Expedition continued west on the Yellowstone River throughout August, surveying along the way. On August 11, a sharp skirmish with Sitting Bull's warriors near the mouth of the Bighorn River at what later became known as Pease Bottom resulted in the death of Private John H. Tuttle and the critically wounding of First Lieutenant Charles Braden, both of the 7th Cavalry. Braden's thigh was shattered by an Indian bullet and the officer remained on permanent sick leave until his retirement from the army in 1878.

== The Expedition Continues ==
After scouting along the Musselshell River, Colonel David S. Stanley and the Yellowstone Expedition made its ways back down the Yellowstone River and returned to Dakota Territory in late 1873, with the expedition ending on September 23, 1873.

== Expedition Casualties ==
Colonel Staneley's expedition suffered 11 men killed, and 1 man wounded. Names of four of the killed: John Honsinger, 7th Cavalry senior veterinarian surgeon; Augustus Baliran, 7th Cavalry sutler; Private John Ball, 7th Cavalry; Private John H. Tuttle, Company E, 7th Cavalry; One of the wounded; First Lieutenant Charles Braden, 7th Cavalry.

Native American casualties while fighting the Expedition were estimated to number 5 killed, with numerous other warriors and horses wounded.

== Aftermath ==
Lieutenant Colonel George A. Custer, Captain Thomas W. Custer, Captain George W. M. Yates, First Lieutenant James Calhoun, and Second Lieutenant Henry M. Harrington, 7th Cavalry officers accompanying the Yellowstone expedition were all killed during the Battle of the Little Bighorn, Montana on June 25, 1876. Captain Myles Moylan and Second Lieutenant Charles Varnum were also present but survived the battle. Moylan, four years later, was awarded the Congressional Medal of Honor for conspicuous bravery at the Battle of Bear Paw, Montana, on September 30, 1877, against the Nez Perce under Chief Joseph near present-day Havre, Montana. Sitting Bull, Gall, Crazy Horse and Rain in the Face who all participated in the fighting against the Yellowstone Expedition of 1873 also participated in the Battle of the Little Big Horn.

The campaign resulted in the encirclement of the Sioux Lands reserved by the 1868 Treaty of Fort Laramie, putting the Lakota, Cheyenne, and Arapahoe in an unfavorable position for the upcoming Great Sioux War.

== Order of battle ==
=== United States Army ===
- 6th U. S. Infantry, Company C: Captain James Powell
- 8th U. S. Infantry, Companies B, C, F and H: Captain Charles Porter
- 9th U. S. Infantry, Companies A, D, E, F, H and I: Lieutenant Colonel Luther P. Bradley
- 17th U. S. Infantry, Companies A, B and H: Major Robert E. A. Crofton
- 20th U. S. Infantry, Company E: Second Lieutenant John McA. Webster
- 22nd U. S. Infantry, Companies B, E, H, I and K: Colonel David S. Stanley, Captain C. J. Dickey
- 7th U. S. Cavalry, Companies A, B, C, E, F, G, H, K, L and M: Lieutenant Colonel George A. Custer
- Artillery Section of (two) 3-inch ordnance rifles (Cannons): Second Lieutenant John McA. Webster
- Indian Scouts (27 men): Second Lieutenant Daniel H. Brush
- Guides: Chief Guide Basil Clement, Mr. Reynolds, Mr. Norris
- Civilians, 353 men: Mr. Rosser, Mr. Frost, Mr. Clifford, Mr. Molesworth
- Steamship Josephine: Captain Grant Marsh
- Steamship Key West:

-Totaling:

- 1,451 Enlisted men.
- 79 Officers.
- 353 Civilians.
- 275 Wagons and Ambulances.
- 2,321 Horses.

=== Native Americans ===
- Lakota Sioux, Sitting Bull.

== Officers Accompanying the Expedition ==
- Colonel David Sloane Stanley, Headquarters, 22nd Infantry.
- Lieutenant Colonel George Armstrong Custer, Headquarters, 7th Cavalry.
- Lieutenant Colonel Luther P. Bradley, Headquarters, 9th Infantry.
- Lieutenant Colonel William B. Royall, Headquarters, 3rd Cavalry.
- Major Edwin Franklin Townsend, Headquarters, 9th Infantry.
- Major Robert E. A. Crofton, Headquarters, 17th Infantry.
- Captain William Ludlow, Headquarters, Corps of Engineers.
- Captain Myles Moylan, Company A, 7th Cavalry.
- Captain Thomas Ward Custer, 7th Cavalry.
- Captain George Wilhelmus Mancius Yates, 7th Cavalry.
- Captain James W. Powell, 6th Infantry.
- Captain Charles Porter, Company B, 8th Infantry
- Captain Augustus W. Corliss, Company C, 8th Infantry.
- Captain James J. VanHorn, Company F, 8th Infantry.
- Captain Henry M. Lazelle, Company H, 8th Infantry.
- Captain Philip H. Owen, Company D, 9th Infantry.
- Captain Edward Pollock, Company E, 9th Infantry.
- Captain Andrew S. Burt, Company H, 9th Infantry.
- Captain Frederick Mears, Company I, 9th Infantry.
- Captain William M. Van Horne, Company A, 17th Infantry.
- Captain Charles J. Dickey, 22nd Infantry.
- First Lieutenant James Calhoun, Company L, 7th Cavalry.
- First Lieutenant Charles Braden, 7th Cavalry. (Wounded in action)
- First Lieutenant Daniel T. Wells, Company C, 8th Infantry.
- First Lieutenant Egbert B. Savage, Company F, 8th Infantry.
- First Lieutenant Cyrus A. Earnest, Company H, 8th Infantry.
- First Lieutenant George W. Griffith, Company A, 9th Infantry.
- First Lieutenant William B. Pease, Company D, 9th Infantry.
- First Lieutenant James Regan, Company E, 9th Infantry.
- First Lieutenant William E. Hofman, Company H, 9th Infantry.
- First Lieutenant William P. Rogers, Company A, 17th Infantry.
- Second Lieutenant Charles Varnum, Company B, 7th Cavalry.
- Second Lieutenant Henry Moore Harrington, Company C, 7th Cavalry.
- Second Lieutenant Edward Lynch, Company C, 8th Infantry.
- Second Lieutenant Patrick Henry Ray, Company H, 8th Infantry.
- Second Lieutenant Jennifer H. Smallwood, Company A, 9th Infantry.
- Second Lieutenant William F. Norris, Company E, 9th Infantry.
- Second Lieutenant Charles M. Rockefeller, Company F, 9th Infantry.
- Second Lieutenant William L. Carpenter, Company H, 9th Infantry.
- Second Lieutenant James Mc B. Stembel, Company I, 9th Infantry.
- Second Lieutenant Daniel H. Brush, Company A, 17th Infantry.
- Second Lieutenant John McA. Webster, Company E, 20th Infantry.

== Literary references ==
Henry Wadsworth Longfellow's poem "Revenge of Rain in the Face" describes the clash that occurred between Rain in the Face and Captain Thomas Custer as a result of the Expedition.

== See also ==
- Battle of Honsinger Bluff
- David S. Stanley
- George A. Custer
- Sitting Bull
