= Battle of Honsinger Bluff =

1873 battle between the US and Lakota

- Part of the Yellowstone Expedition of 1873
Date	August 4, 1873
Location	Custer County Montana, U.S. territory since May 7, 1868 46°29′23″N 105°55′05″W
Result	Inconclusive

Belligerents
Lakota people	United States

Commanders and leaders
Rain in the Face	United States George Armstrong Custer

Units involved
	7th Cavalry Regiment (United States)

Strength
~200 Warriors	~91 Soldiers, 4 Civilians

Casualties and losses
3 wounded	3 killed, 1 wounded

The Battle of Honsinger Bluff was a conflict between the United States Army and the Lakota people on August 4, 1873, along the Yellowstone River near present-day Miles City, Montana.

The main combatants were units of the U.S. 7th Cavalry under Lt. Col. George Armstrong Custer and Native Americans from the village of the Hunkpapa, many of whom would confront Custer again approximately three years later at the Battle of the Little Bighorn, located within the Crow Indian Reservation.

== Geography ==
The Battle of Honsinger Bluff took place at a point approximately 1 mile (1.6 km) east of the confluence of the Tongue River and Yellowstone River. The battlefield, located on a floodplain of the Yellowstone River, was dominated by a massive gravelly hill to the northeast, often referenced as the "Big Hill" in historical accounts of the battle, but referenced locally as "Yellowstone Hill". This hill is nearly 13 miles (21 km) long, between 1 and 3 miles (4.8 km) wide, and has steep slopes of 200 to 300 feet (91 m). It is the present location of the Miles City Airport. To the east and south lies the Yellowstone River. The floodplain, varying between 1 and 3 miles (4.8 km) in width, extends westerly upstream along the Yellowstone for nearly 13 miles (21 km) until it meets Locke Bluff near Hathaway, Montana. Key positions involved Honsinger Bluff on the southwesterly face of Yellowstone Hill and two large groves of cottonwood trees on old channels of the Yellowstone, one approximately 2 miles (3.2 km) westerly of Yellowstone Hill and the second approximately 4 miles (6.4 km) westerly.

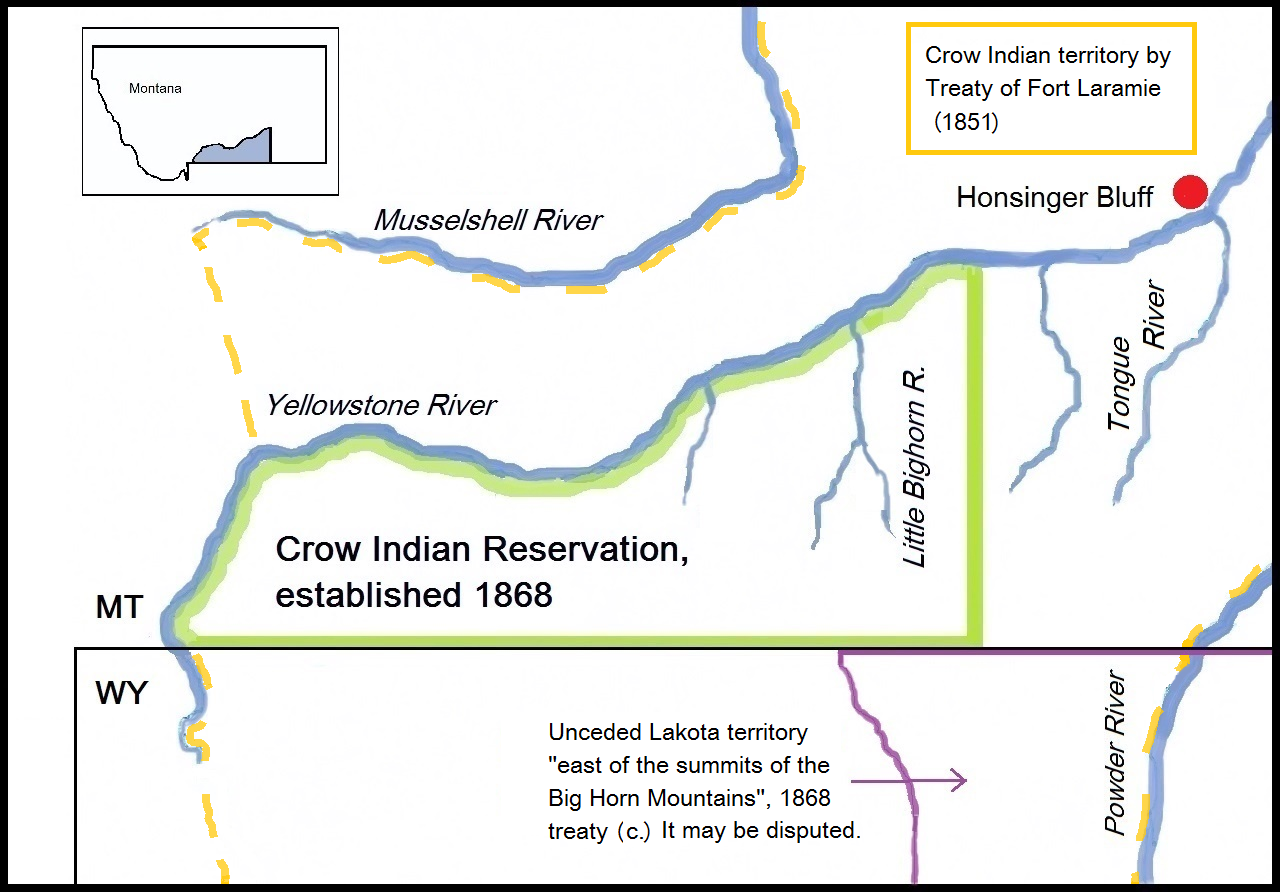
Map with the Battlefield of Honsinger Bluff (1873) in Montana and relevant Indian territories. The battlefield was former Crow Indian treaty territory. The Crow tribe ceded the site as well as other areas to the United States on May 7, 1868. The ongoing conflict between the U.S. and the buffalo-seeking Lakota was a clash between two growing empires with most battles "occurring on lands only recently taken by the Sioux from other tribes." Note that the line for the 1868 unceded Lakota territory "east of the summits of the Big Horn Mountains" may be disputed.

== Background ==
In 1851, the site of the future battlefield came to be a locale in a treaty territory for the first time. The Treaty of Fort Laramie defined the area as Crow Indian country. The Lakota tribe recognized this. Nearly all the battles in the mid-1860s and the 1870s "between the army and the Dakota [Lakota] were on lands those Indians had taken from other tribes since 1851." When the Crows accepted to live in a smaller reservation on May 7, 1868, all the 1851 Crow treaty land north of the Yellowstone—including the future Honsinger Bluff—became U.S. territory.

== Participants ==
=== U.S. Army forces ===
Custer and units of the 7th Cavalry were part of the military column commanded by Col. David S. Stanley accompanying the 1873 Northern Pacific Railway survey party surveying the north side of the Yellowstone River west of the Powder River in eastern Montana. Stanley's column consisted of a 1,300-man force of cavalry, infantry, and two artillery pieces (3" rifled Rodman guns). It traveled with 275 mule-drawn wagons and 353 civilians involved in the survey. 27 scouts of Native American or mixed ancestry supported the column.

=== Lakota forces ===
The Lakota forces were from the lodge of Sitting Bull, situated near Locke Bluff to the west, estimated at anywhere from 400 to 500 lodges. It included Hunkpapa Sioux under Gall who were accompanied by the warchief Rain in the Face, Oglala Sioux under Crazy Horse, Miniconjou, and Cheyenne.

== Prelude ==
On Sunday, August 3, 1873, Stanley's column camped near the mouth of Sunday Creek, a tributary to the Yellowstone on the northeasterly end of Yellowstone Hill. Early on the morning of August 4, the column moved up the northwest side of the hill along the south fork of Sunday Creek. Capt. George W. Yates, with a troop of cavalry, accompanied the surveyors along the southeast side of the hill along the Yellowstone River. Custer, with Companies A and B of the 7th Cavalry under the command of Capt. Myles Moylan scouted to the west ahead of the Stanley column. Custer's group consisted of 86 men, 5 officers and Indian scouts. Custer's brother, Lt. Tom Custer, and his brother-in-law, Lt. James Calhoun, accompanied him.

Custer's troops traveled along the top of Yellowstone Hill and then descended a steep buffalo trail on its northwesterly end on to the broad, grass-covered flood plain. Custer spotted a wooded area along the Yellowstone, about 2 miles (3.2 km) to the West that would be a suitable location for the Stanley column to camp that evening. He dismounted his men in the woods, where they napped and fished in the river. Their horses grazed on the grassy floodplain. Having a premonition of danger, Custer set out two four-man guard patrols.

Scouts from Sitting Bull's village traveled along the Yellowstone west of Yellowstone Hill but did not appear to be aware of the presence of the Stanley column. They did, however, spot Custer's group resting in the woods. Reinforcements were obtained from Sitting Bull's village and by noon somewhere between 100 and 300 Indians were hiding in the second wooded area 2 miles (3.2 km) west of Custer's location.

== The Battle ==
=== The Decoy Move ===
A small band of Lakota approached the cavalry's grazing horse from the West. They were spotted by the guard units, who alerted the other troops. Custer ordered his men to saddle up and he began to pursue the Lakota riders in the company of his orderly and Lt. Calhoun. Tom Custer followed with a group of approximately 20 troopers. Myles Moylan led the remainder of the unit behind Tom Custer. George Custer halted his pursuit and the Lakota riders also halted. When he would proceed, they would proceed. They were headed toward the wooded area along the river about 2 miles (3.2 km) from where Custer's troops were located. This was a similar tactic used by Native American forces in the Fetterman Massacre near Fort Phil Kearny, Wyoming in December 1866. As he approached the wooded area, the force of Lakota hidden in the woods, estimated as anywhere from 100 to 300, broke out in pursuit of Custer.

Custer retreated through a skirmish line formed by Tom Custer's men. The volley from the skirmish line distracted the pursuing Lakota enough to halt their charge. Custer had Moylan pull back to the wooded area previously occupied by his troops.

=== The Siege ===
After reaching the wooded area, the cavalry troops dismounted, forming a semicircular perimeter along a former channel of the Yellowstone. The usual configuration for dismounted cavalry was every fourth man holding horses, however, due to the length of the semicircular perimeter, every eighth man held horses. The bank of the dry channel served as a natural parapet.

The Lakota laid siege to the cavalry position, but had little success. About an hour into the battle, a force of nearly 50 warriors attempted to flank the cavalry's perimeter by traveling down along the river. They were hidden by the high bank, however a scout accompanying them was spotted and drew fire. The group, thinking they had been discovered, retreated.

The flanking tactic having failed, the Lakota set fire to the grass hoping to use the smoke as a screen to approach the cavalry perimeter. However, Custer's troops likewise used the smoke as a screen to move closer to the Lakota forces and the tactic did not favor either side.

The siege continued for about three hours in reported 110 °F (43 °C) heat.

=== The Ambush of Honsinger ===
The 7th Cavalry's senior veterinary surgeon, Dr. John Honsinger, rode with Stanley's column, along with the sutler, Augustus Baliran. Honsinger was a German native who, in 1869, was appointed as the first veterinary surgeon for the post-Civil War 7th cavalry.

New York Tribune correspondent Samuel J. Barrows, with the Stanley column, had ridden with Dr. Honsinger earlier in the day and described him as "a fine-looking, portly man, about 55 years of age, dressed in a blue coat and buckskin pantaloons, mounted on his fine blooded horse.... No man of the regiment took more care of his horse than he. It was an extra-professional care—a love of the horse for his own sake"

Around 2:00 p.m., oblivious to the battle raging 2 to 3 miles (3.2 to 4.8 km) from them, Honsinger and Baliran left the Stanley column to ride down to the river in order to water their horses and possibly hunt for agates. A Ree scout with the Stanley column, who did not speak English, attempted to stop Honsinger by grabbing the reins of his horse, pointing to the West and saying "Indians, Indians". Honsinger, hearing sporadic shooting in that direction and believing it was Custer's men hunting game, corrected the scout by stating "Cavalry, Cavalry" and rode on.

At approximately the same time, Privates John H. Ball and M. Brown, who were part of Lt. Yates' troops guarding the surveyors along the river, slipped away from their company and headed for the river to cool off and nap. Ball spotted Honsinger and Baliran and rode to join them.

At the same time, Rain in the Face and five of his warriors headed to the base of what is now called Honsinger Bluff to serve as lookouts for any approaching cavalry. The Lakota spotted Honsinger and Baliran approaching and hid amid the rocks and scrub brush at the base of Honsinger Bluff. So successful was the concealment of the Lakota that they were able to grab the reins of Honsinger's horse as he rode by, pulling him from the horse and shooting him as he fell. Baliran and Ball were also quickly dispatched by Rain in the Face and his men.

=== The Charge ===
The prolonged siege by the Lakota forces, lasting nearly three hours, was remarkably unusual, as clashes normally were much briefer and rarely involved sustained, in-place fighting. Custer's troops had nearly exhausted the 100 rounds per man ammunition cache and sent to the horse holders for their ammunition supplies. Toward the end of the battle, due to heat exhaustion of both the cavalry troops and Lakota warriors, the shooting had become very sporadic. At this point, Custer ordered his men to mount up, and the bugler sounded the charge.

Pvt. Brown, napping at the base of Honsinger Bluff, awakened to witness the ambush of Honsinger and Baliran and the shooting of the fleeing Pvt. Ball. Brown mounted his horse without a saddle and rode wildly toward the Stanley column. Stanley heard shooting, probably the shots from Rain in the Face's scouting party, and at about the same time saw Pvt. Brown approaching at a gallop yelling "All down there are killed". Fearing a repeat of the Fetterman Massacre, Stanley ordered the entire remaining 7th Cavalry forward, the advance unit being led by 2nd Lt. Charles Braden. Arriving at the brow of Honsinger Bluff, Braden's troop had to dismount and lead their horses down the steep slope. As they remounted, Rain in the Face's party passed within 100 yards of them, riding back toward the main Lakota force.

Custer's mounted troopers burst from their wood position in a charge that scattered the Lakota forces, who fell back upriver with Custer's troops in pursuit. They pursued them for nearly four miles but were never able to close on them sufficiently to engage them.

Historians still debate whether Custer charged independently of the approaching forces under Braden, or whether he had spotted Braden's approach and coordinated his charge with the arrival of the reinforcements.

=== Casualties ===
While Custer's 7th Cavalry forces suffered 1 man wounded and two horses killed according to Custer's post-battle report or possibly 11 dead. The 7th Cavalry lost its senior veterinarian surgeon, Dr. John Honsinger, its sutler, Augustus Baliran, as well as Pvt. Ball. While Honsinger and Baliran were found the day of the battle, Ball's body was not located until September 1873.

Although no bodies were recovered on the battlefield, Lakota casualties were estimated to number 5 dead, with numerous other warriors and horses wounded.

== Aftermath ==
Rain in the Face retained Honsinger's gold watch and later bragged about killing Honsinger and Balitran. Custer learned of Rain in the Face's claims and dispatched his brother, Tom, to the Standing Rock Reservation to arrest him for the murder of Honsinger and Balitran. He was apprehended and jailed on December 13, 1874. Rain in the Face escaped from custody a few months later and vowed to cut out the heart of Tom Custer and eat it.

Lt. Braden was critically wounded a week later, on August 11, 1873, in another clash with Sitting Bull's forces upriver near the mouth of the Big Horn River. His thigh was shattered by a Lakota bullet and he remained on permanent sick leave until his retirement from the Army in 1878. George Custer, Tom Custer and James Calhoun, along with Capt. George Yates, all perished at the Little Big Horn on June 25, 1876. Myles Moylan and Charles Varnum survived the battle on Reno Hill. Moylan, four years later, was awarded the Congressional Medal of Honor for conspicuous bravery at the September 30, 1877, Battle of Bear Paw where Lt. Col. Nelson A. Miles forces captured the Nez Perce band of Chief Joseph at Snake Creek near Havre, Montana. Sitting Bull, Gall, Crazy Horse and Rain in the Face all participated in the Little Big Horn battle. Rain in the Face in later years claimed to have cut the heart out of Tom Custer at Little Big Horn and taken a bite out of it.

Veterinarian John Honsinger was buried along the Yellowstone River at the base of Honsinger Bluff. Some authorities claim that Father Pierre-Jean De Smet, happened along that evening, and oversaw the burial. De Smet was rumored to have baptized Sitting Bull earlier. However, Fr. De Smet died in St. Louis on May 23, 1873, over two months prior to the battle.

U.S. Army troops occupied this area again on June 6 and 7, 1876, prior to the battle on the Little Big Horn. The Montana column, consisting of the 2nd Cavalry and 7th Infantry under the command of Col. John Gibbon, camped in "a beautiful cottonwood grove on splendid sod" a few miles west of Honsinger Bluff. This was likely either the grove in which Sitting Bull's ambush force hid, or the one occupied by Custer's troops during the battle.

== Literary References ==
The legend of Rain in the Face cutting out Tom Custer's heart is referenced in Henry Wadsworth Longfellow's poem "Revenge of Rain in the Face".

== See also ==
- Sitting Bull
- George Armstrong Custer
- Thomas Custer
- Rain in the Face
