= Andrew S. Burt =

American Army general (1839–1915)

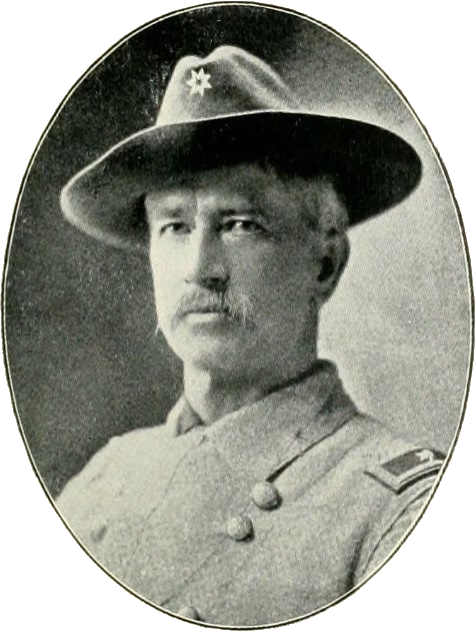
- Born: 21 November 1839; Cincinnati, Ohio, U.S.
- Died: 12 January 1915 (aged 75); Washington, D.C., U.S.
- Military career
- Branch: Union Army; United States Army
- Service years: 1861–1902
- Rank: Brigadier general
- Commands: 1st Brigade, 2nd Division, VII Corps; 1st Brigade, 1st Division, I Corps; 25th Infantry (Colored); Company F, 1st Battalion, 18th Infantry
- Conflicts: American Civil War; American Indian Wars; Spanish–American War; Philippine–American War

Andrew Sheridan Burt (21 November 1839 – 12 January 1915) was a United States Army soldier who rose from private to brigadier general and served in four conflicts over the course of his 41-year military career. During the Philippine–American War, he commanded the 25th Infantry (Colored), one of four segregated African-American regiments (two cavalry and two infantry) retained by the Army after March 1869.

== Early life and education ==
Burt was born and raised in Cincinnati, Ohio. In 1857, he entered Yale College but left after two and a half years without graduating to join A. G. Burt & Co., his father's banking house in Cincinnati.

== Career ==
After the outbreak of the American Civil War, Burt enlisted as a private in the 6th Ohio Volunteer Infantry in April 1861. A month later, he was offered a regular army commission as a first lieutenant. Promoted to sergeant, he accepted the officer's commission in July 1861 and was assigned to the newly established 18th U.S. Infantry in the Army of the Ohio.

As a junior officer, Burt initially served as an aide-de-camp on the 3rd Brigade, 1st Division staff. Colonel Robert L. McCook was the brigade commander and Brigadier General George H. Thomas was the division commander. At the Battle of Mill Springs, Burt was wounded and later brevetted captain for gallant and meritorious service. In January 1863, he joined the staff of Major General William Rosecrans' Army of the Cumberland. In May 1863, Burt was promoted to captain. Later that year, he was commended for gallantry after the Battle of Chickamauga by corps commander Major General Alexander McCook.

Burt next returned to the 18th Infantry as commander of Company F, 1st Battalion and served in this position for the remainder of the war. He helped lead the charge against Missionary Ridge at Chattanooga. Burt then participated in the Atlanta campaign and was later brevetted major for gallant and meritorious service during the campaign and especially at the Battle of Jonesborough. After the war, his company marched first to Fort Leavenworth, Kansas and then to Fort Bridger, Wyoming.

In September 1866, Burt was transferred to the 27th U.S. Infantry. Over the following years, he served as a company or battalion commander on the frontier. In Fall 1867, he repulsed an attack by Oglala Lakota warriors led by Red Cloud while leading a detachment of recruits to Fort Phil Kearny, Wyoming. In 1868, Burt was involved in skirmishes with Indians at Fort C. F. Smith, Montana. In June 1869, the 27th Infantry was absorbed into the 9th Infantry. In 1873, Burt participated in the Yellowstone Expedition. In 1875, he helped escort the Newton–Jenney Party to the Black Hills of South Dakota. In 1876, Burt participated in the Big Horn Expedition to Montana. During the Battle of the Rosebud, his company provided covering fire for the cavalry retreat. Burt subsequently wrote the play May Cody or, Lost and Won for Buffalo Bill Cody's traveling show.

In January 1883, Burt was promoted to major and transferred to the 8th Infantry. While serving as commander of Fort Bidwell, California in 1885, he managed tensions between the settlers and local Indians. In January 1888, Burt was promoted to lieutenant colonel and transferred to the 7th Infantry. In July 1892, he was promoted to colonel and given command of the 25th Infantry (Colored).

During the Spanish–American War, Burt served as a brigadier general of volunteers from May to December 1898. He was given command of the 1st Brigade, 1st Division, I Corps and then the 1st Brigade, 2nd Division, VII Corps. Burt supervised training but did not participate in any combat operations.

After the war, Burt reverted to his permanent rank of colonel and resumed command of the 25th Infantry. His unit was soon sent to the Philippines, where it helped suppress the native insurrection. Burt was recalled to the United States in early 1902 and promoted to brigadier general effective 1 April. At the time of his nomination by President Theodore Roosevelt, he was the second-most senior colonel in the Army. Burt subsequently retired from active duty on 15 April 1902.

== Personal life ==
Burt was the son of Andrew Gano Burt and Anne Green Thompson. He had five sisters and one brother.

Burt married Elizabeth Johnston Reynolds (4 March 1839 – 27 March 1926) on 13 September 1862. They had two boys and a girl. Their younger son, Reynolds Johnston Burt (2 August 1874 – 19 September 1969), was an 1896 U.S. Military Academy graduate who retired from the Army as a brigadier general in 1937. As a young lieutenant, Reynolds Burt served as an aide-de-camp to his father during the Spanish–American War and then as a junior officer in his regiment during the Philippine insurrection.

After retirement, Andrew Burt was active in the Army and Navy Union and was an advocate for African-American Army veterans. He foresaw the potential for conflict between the United States and Japan over the Philippines. Burt was also a member of the Military Order of the Carabao.

Around midnight on 11 January 1915, Burt suffered heart failure in his residence at The Portner in Washington, D.C. and died soon afterward. After a funeral service at St. Thomas' Episcopal Church, he was interred at Arlington National Cemetery with full military honors on 15 January 1915.
