= Fort McKean =

Fort McKean is a fort located inside Kansas along the Kansas-Missouri border. On November 14, 1862, Company C of the 3rd Wisconsin Cavalry, led by Lieut. James B. Pond, established a camp at Morris Mills on Drywood Creek. It was fifteen miles southeast of Fort Scott. Sometime later this camp was given the name of Fort McKean. The post was probably on the Fort Scott-Fort Gibson Military Road, and many, including Pond, thought the post was inside Missouri. Throughout its history, Fort McKean was a small post, ranging in strength from 20 to 60 men. It is unknown what buildings or defenses were erected there.

Pond wrote the duties of Fort McKean's troops were "escorting trains, scouting the country, and protecting the border." On October 2, 1863, Pond's men were ordered to leave the post and report to Fort Blair (see Fort Baxter (Kansas)), in present-day Baxter Springs, Kansas. Three days later Pond's men were attacked by Confederate guerrilla William C. Quantrill and 400 men.

On October 12, ten days later, Company C was back at Fort McKean. Pond remained in command until at least August 1864. After February 1865 Company C was replaced by Company G of the 17th Illinois Cavalry, which remained until at least June 1865. Then or probably shortly afterward, Fort McKean was abandoned.
