= Henry Moore Harrington =

American military officer

- Born: April 30, 1849; Albion, New York
- Died: June 25, 1876 (aged 27); Montana
- Military career
- Allegiance: United States of America
- Branch: United States Army
- Service years: 1872–76
- Rank: Second Lieutenant
- Units: Company C, 7th United States Cavalry Regiment
- Conflicts: Native American Wars: Yellowstone Expedition (1873); Battle of Honsinger Bluff; Bighorn River Skirmish; Black Hills Expedition (1874); Battle of Little Big Horn

Henry Moore Harrington (April 30, 1849 – June 25, 1876) was a military officer in the 7th United States Cavalry Regiment who went missing in action during the Battle of Little Big Horn in Montana Territory.

== Early life ==
Henry Moore Harrington was born in Albion, New York, the son of Shelby A. Harrington and Nancy K. (Moore) Harrington. Early in his childhood, his family relocated to Coldwater, Michigan. He attended the Cleveland Institute at University Heights, Ohio, and declined an appointment to the U.S. Naval Academy before accepting an appointment to West Point in 1868.

== 7th Cavalry ==
Upon graduation from the U.S. Military Academy (ranking 17th the Class of 1872), he was commissioned a Second Lieutenant of Cavalry and assigned to Company C, 7th United States Cavalry with an initial posting to North Carolina. He married Grace Berard, the granddaughter of a West Point professor. The couple had two children.

In 1873, Company C was reassigned to Dakota Territory and Lieutenant Henry Harrington accompanied Lieutenant Colonel (Brevet Major General) George Armstrong Custer and a large part of the 7th Cavalry on the Yellowstone Expedition of 1873, taking part in the Battle of Honsinger Bluff, Montana on August 4, 1873, and in a skirmish near Pompey's Pillar, Montana on August 11, 1873. In the summer of 1874, Harrington and his Company C were part of the 7th Cavalry's military escort for the Black Hills Expedition under the command of Lieutenant Colonel George Armstrong Custer.

On May 17, 1876, during the Great Sioux War of 1876, Brigadier General Alfred Terry's Dakota column departed Fort Abraham Lincoln and embarked on the Little Big Horn campaign. Harrington's 7th Cavalry Regiment composed most of the Dakota column, but was in short supply of officers, so Harrington as a Second Lieutenant was given the command of Company C, and accompanied Major Marcus Reno's June 10–18, 1876 scout on the Powder River, and Tongue River in south-eastern Montana Territory. After Harrington and the over 300 soldiers on the Reno Scout rejoined Colonel Custer and the 7th Cavalry, the regiment marched up Rosebud Creek, then crossed to the Little Bighorn River. On June 25, 1876, the 647 men with the 7th Cavalry including Henry Harrington under the command of George A. Custer attacked a village of several thousand Native Americans, in what became known as the Battle of the Little Bighorn. Harrington and 219 men of the 7th Cavalry under Custer were separated from the rest of the regiment, and were Killed in action. Henry Moore Harrington's remains were not identified on the battlefield, and the Lieutenant was declared Missing in action and presumed dead.

His wife made a series of trips to the battlefield to look for his body or information regarding his whereabouts if he had survived the savage fight, but to no avail.

== Link ==
- Bronze Star reference material
