= Myles Moylan =

American Army officer (1838–1909)

- Born: December 17, 1838; Tuam, Co Galway, Ireland, or Amesbury, Massachusetts, U.S.
- Died: December 11, 1909 (aged 70); San Diego, California, U.S.
- Burial place: Greenwood Memorial Park, San Diego, California
- Military career
- Allegiance: United States of America
- Branch: United States Army
- Service years: 1857–1893
- Rank: Major
- Commands: Company A, 7th Cavalry Regiment
- Conflicts: American Civil War: Battle of Wilson's Creek; Battle of Fort Henry; Battle of Fort Donelson; Battle of Shiloh; Siege of Corinth; Battle of Gettysburg; American Indian Wars: Yellowstone Expedition of 1873; Battle of Honsinger Bluff; Black Hills Expedition (1874); Battle of the Little Bighorn; Battle of Canyon Creek; Battle of Bear Paw; Battle of Crow Agency; Washita Massacre; Wounded Knee Massacre
- Awards: Medal of Honor

Myles Moylan (December 17, 1838 – December 11, 1909) was an Irish officer in the United States Army with an extensive military career, which included the battle of Gettysburg, and the battle of the Little Bighorn. He was awarded the Medal of Honor for his gallantry in leadership at the Battle of Bear Paw. He also participated in the Washita Massacre and Wounded Knee Massacre.

== Early life ==
Myles Moylan was born on December 17, 1838, at Mall House, Tuam, County Galway, Ireland. Amesbury, Massachusetts, U.S. is sometimes erroneously cited as his place of birth. By way of dealing with this confusion over his birthplace, the Congressional Medal of Honor Society has noted the following on his citation - Myles Moylan served many years in the U.S. Army. During that time, he gave varying places of birth. Sometimes it was Amesbury, Massachusetts, and sometimes it was Tuam, County Galway, Ireland. Birth records show that he was, indeed, born in Ireland. Official Army records continue to show his birthplace as Amesbury because that is the place of birth he gave when he started the enlistment for which he earned the Medal of Honor.

His parents,Thomas Moylan and Margaret Reilly, were married in Tuam in 1814 and are buried in Claretuam Cemetery, County Galway. In the mid-1850s, Myles followed his elder brothers Patrick and Thomas to West Newbury, Massachusetts, where he worked as a shoemaker. He enlisted as a private in the U.S. Army on June 8, 1857, and was assigned to the 2nd U.S. Dragoons. He was promoted to corporal on October 1, 1858, to sergeant in October 1860, then to first sergeant on May 17, 1861.

== American Civil War ==
Moylan's first battle, the Battle of Wilson's Creek in Missouri, was fought on August 10, 1861. Moylan also participated in the Battle of Fort Henry, Tennessee, on February 6, 1862, and in the Battle of Fort Donelson, Tennessee, on February 11–16, 1862. Then the Battle of Shiloh, Tennessee, April 6–7, 1862, and the Siege of Corinth, Mississippi, from April 29 – May 30, 1862. On March 28, 1863, Moylan was promoted to the rank of second lieutenant in the 5th United States Cavalry. In this organization he fought in the Battle of Gettysburg, Pennsylvania, July 1–3, 1863. On October 25, 1863, Lieutenant Moylan was dismissed from the service for being AWOL (absent without leave) in Washington, D.C. He then enlisted into the 4th Massachusetts Volunteer Cavalry Regiment on December 2, 1863, under the assumed name of Charles E. Thomas from Amesbury, Massachusetts, shedding his Irish identity to escape the prevalent anti-Irish prejudice. This led to ongoing confusion about his birthplace. Moylan was appointed a sergeant in that regiment on December 26, 1863, a first lieutenant, then a captain on December 1, 1864. He was then brevetted to the rank of major on April 9, 1865, and mustered out in November 1865. After the war, he was elected as a companion of the California Commandery of the Military Order of the Loyal Legion of the United States.

== Indian wars ==
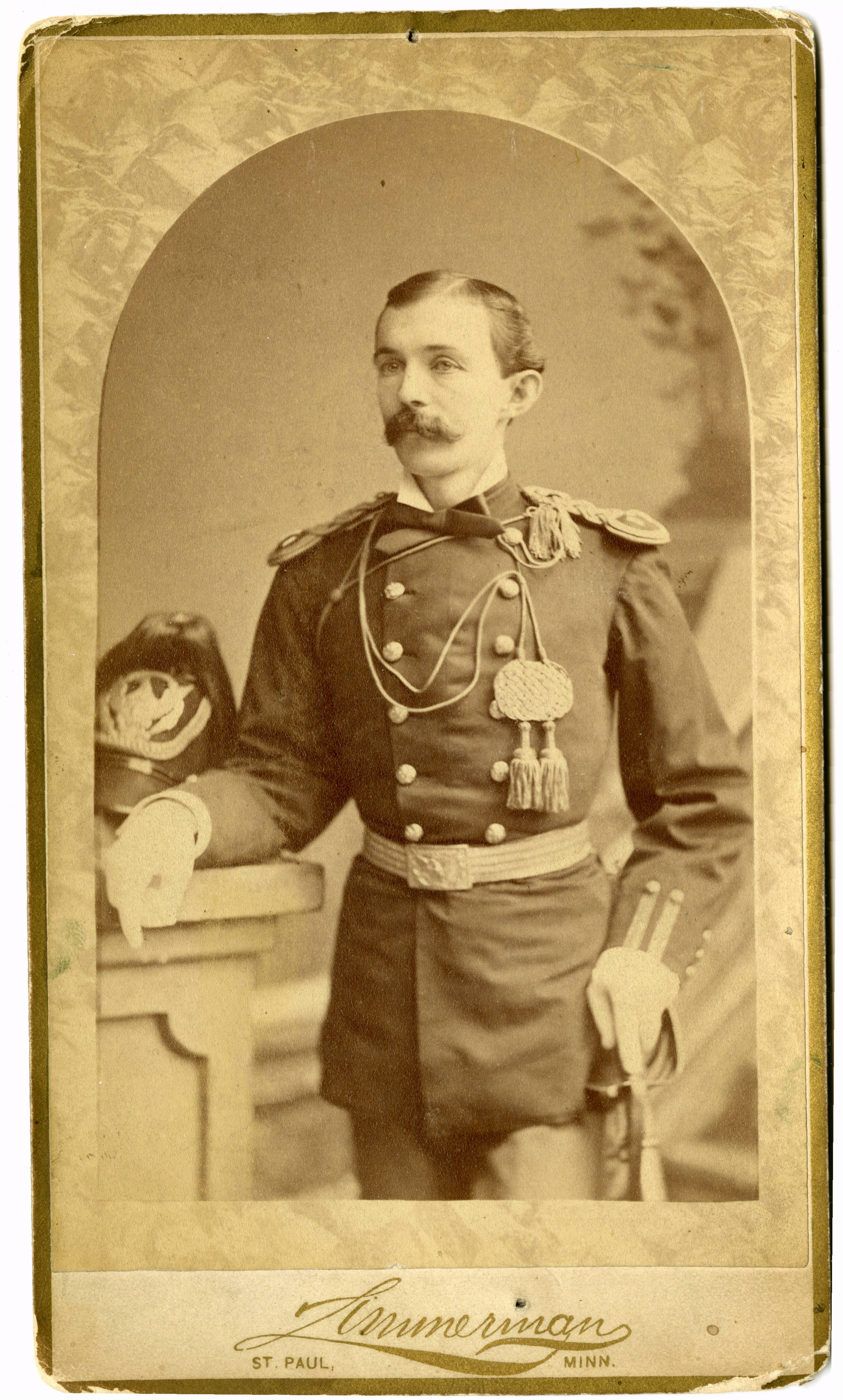
Moylan in the late 1860s

In January 1866, Moylan again enlisted as a private into the United States Army, and on September 1, 1866, was appointed the regimental sergeant major of the newly formed 7th United States Cavalry Regiment, then was promoted to a first lieutenant in December 1866. He participated in 1868 Washita Campaign, and was present at the Washita Massacre, in present-day Oklahoma, on November 27, 1868. Moylan was then again promoted to the rank of captain in March 1872, and the same year married Charlotte "Lottie" Calhoun on October 22, 1872, at Madison, Indiana; they had no children. She was the sister of Lieutenant James Calhoun, the brother-in-law of George Custer, who was killed in the Battle of Little Bighorn. Moylan participated in the Yellowstone Expedition of 1873, and in the Black Hills Expedition of 1874. Captain Moylan again fought with the 7th Cavalry, at the Battle of the Little Bighorn, Montana Territory, on June 25–26, 1876, as the commander of Company A (which was part of the battalion placed under the command of Major Marcus Reno). He was awarded the Medal of Honor for his actions on September 30, 1877, during the Battle of Bear Paw, Montana Territory. Moylan was also present at the Wounded Knee Massacre, in South Dakota, on December 29, 1890. Moylan was promoted to major in April 1892, and retired in 1893.

== Later life ==
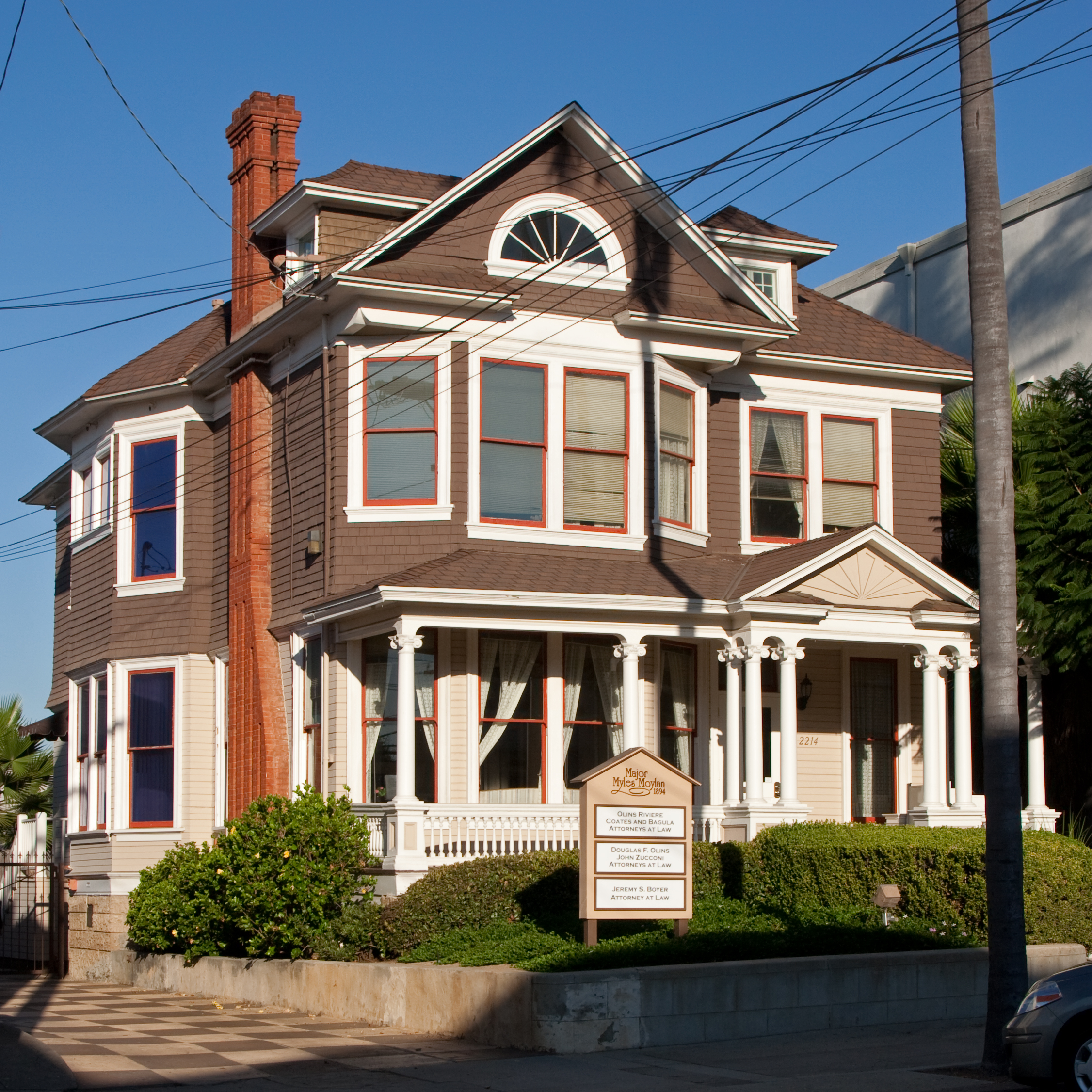
Major Myles Moylan House

After Moylan retired, he settled in San Diego, where he had a home built. That house was designed by architects Irving Gill and Joseph Falkenham, and is now on the National Register of Historic Places. Moylan died at his home on December 11, 1909, from cancer.

== Medal of Honor ==
On November 27, 1894, Moylan was presented with the Medal of Honor, the highest award in the United States Armed Forces, for his service in the Indian War Campaigns. Moylan "gallantly led his command in action against Nez Perce Indians until he was severely wounded."

== See also ==
- 7th United States Cavalry Regiment
- List of Medal of Honor recipients for the Indian Wars
