= Rain-in-the-Face =

Warchief of the Lakota tribe of Native Americans (1835-1905)

- Ité Omáǧažu
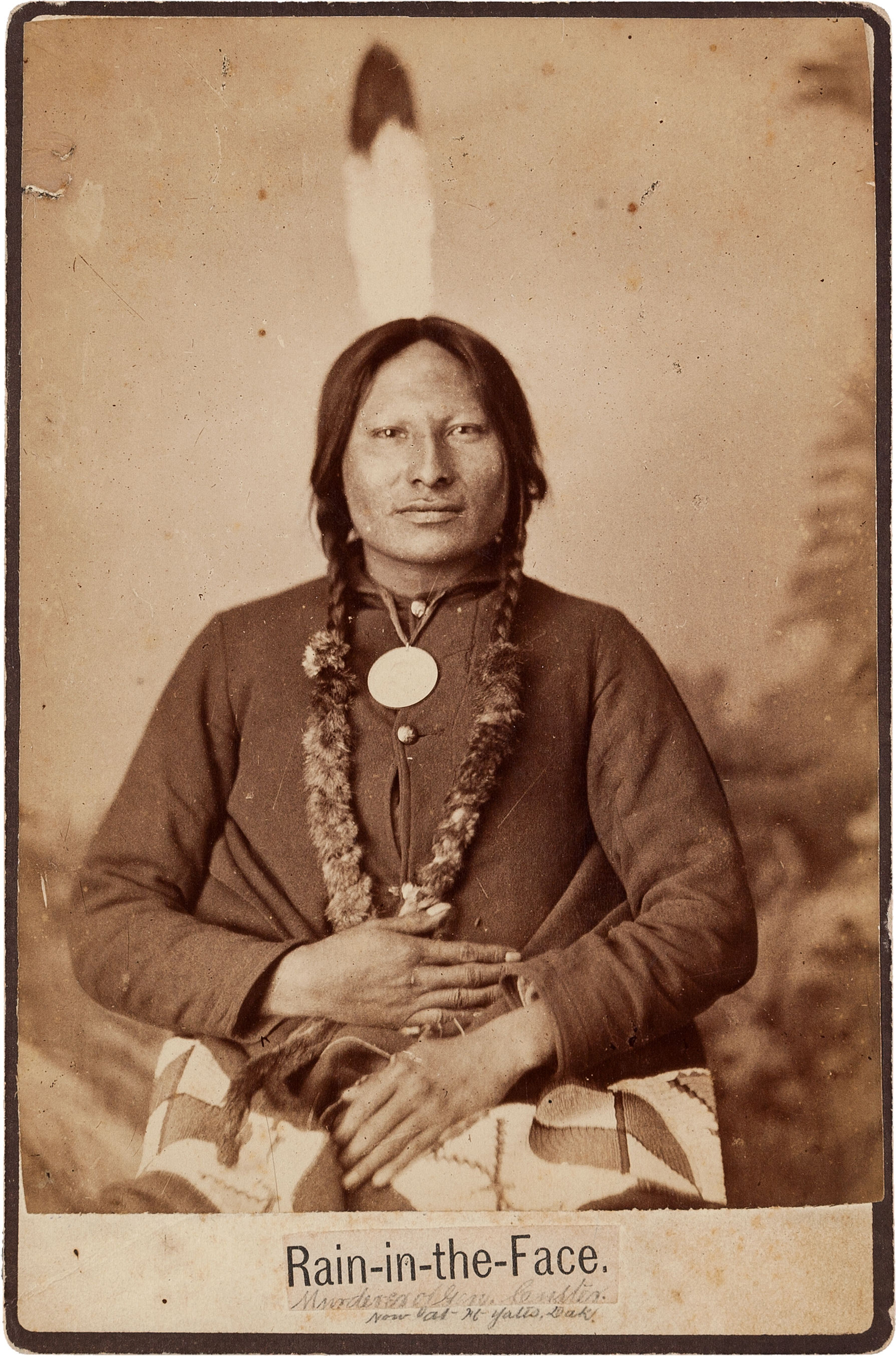
- Rain-in-the-Face in 1874

Lakota leader

Personal details
- Born: c. 1835
- Died: September 15, 1905 (aged 69–70) Bullhead Station, Standing Rock Sioux Reservation (North and South Dakota)

Rain-in-the-Face (Lakota: Ité Omáǧažu; (Note: or Itómaǧažu) c. 1835 – September 15, 1905) was a warchief of the Lakota tribe of Native Americans. His mother was a Dakota related to the band of famous Chief Inkpaduta. In 1876, he participated in the Battle of the Little Bighorn that defeated the 7th Cavalry Regiment under Lt. Colonel George Armstrong Custer.

== Biography ==
Born in the Dakota Territory near the forks of the Cheyenne River about 1835, Rain-in-the-Face was from the Hunkpapa band within the Lakota nation. His name may have been a result of a fight when he was a boy in which his face was splattered like rain with his Cheyenne adversary's blood. Late in his life, the chief related that the name was reinforced by an incident when he was a young man where he was in a battle in a heavy rainstorm with a band of Gros Ventres. At the end of the lengthy combat, his face was streaked with war paint.

He first fought against the whites in the summer of 1866 when he participated in a raid against Fort Totten in what is now North Dakota. In 1868, he again fought the U.S. Army in the Fetterman Fight near Fort Phil Kearny in present-day Wyoming. He again was involved in fighting in 1873 when he took part in the Battle of Honsinger Bluff where he ambushed and killed an army veterinarian Dr. John Honsinger, an army private and another civilian near present-day Miles City, Montana. He returned to the Standing Rock Sioux Reservation, but was arrested by Captain Thomas Custer in 1874 on orders of General George A. Custer for the murder of Honsinger. He was taken to Fort Abraham Lincoln and incarcerated. However, he escaped (or was freed by sympathetic Indian policemen) and returned to the reservation, then fled to the Powder River. In the spring of 1876, he joined Sitting Bull's band and traveled with him to the Little Big Horn River in early June.

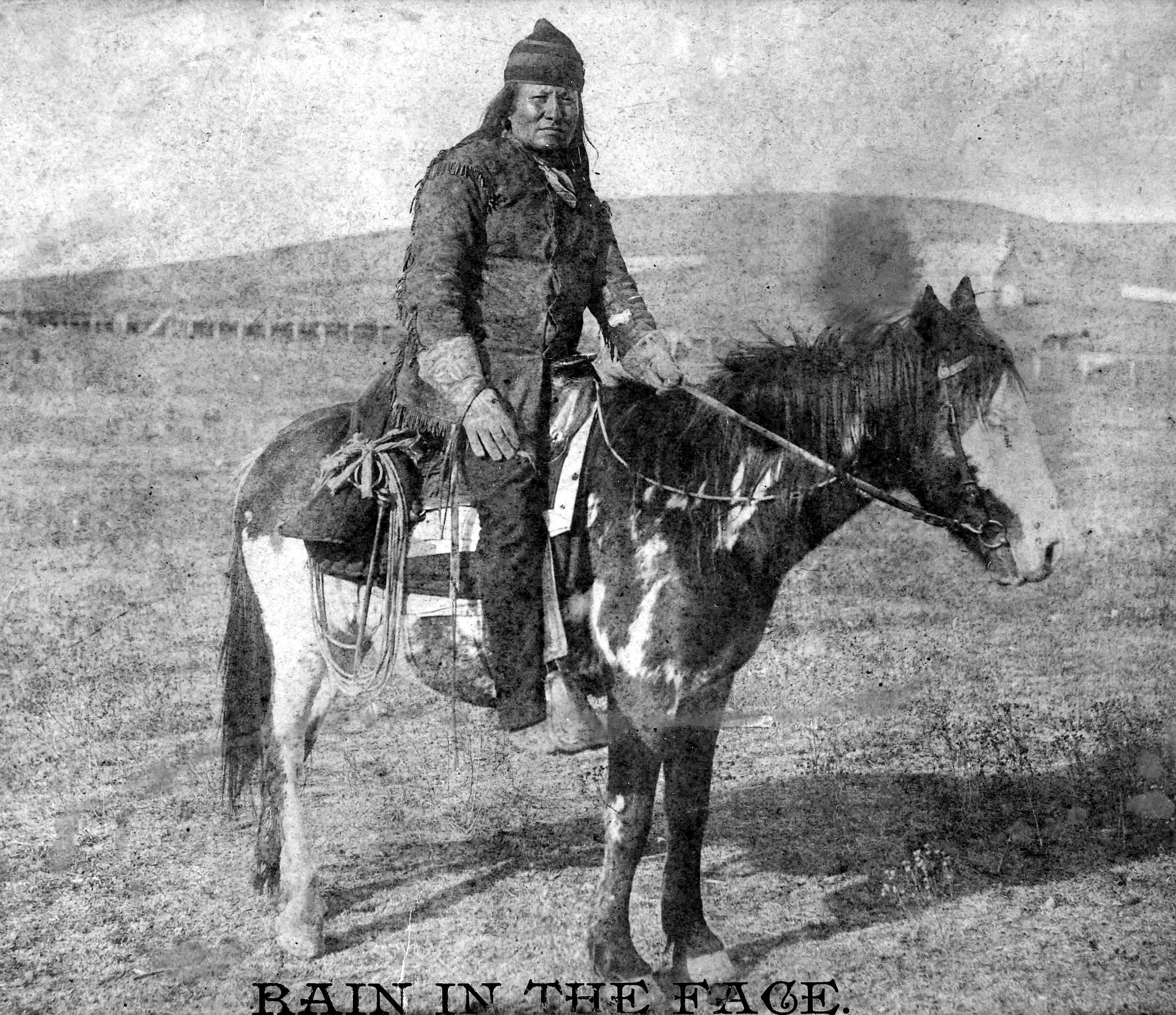
Rain-in-the-Face circa 1880–1890

During the subsequent fighting at the Battle of Little Big Horn on Custer Hill on June 25, 1876, Rain-in-the-Face is alleged to have cut the heart out of Thomas Custer, a feat that was popularized by American poet Henry Wadsworth Longfellow in "The Revenge of Rain in the Face". According to the dubious legend, Rain-in-the-Face was fulfilling a vow of vengeance because he thought Captain Thomas Custer had unjustly imprisoned him in 1874. Some contemporary accounts also claimed that the war chief had personally dispatched George Custer as well, but in the confused fighting, a number of similar claims have been attributed to other warriors. Late in his life, in a conversation with writer Charles Eastman, Rain-in-the-Face denied killing George Custer or mutilating Tom Custer.

Rain-in-the-Face joined other Hunkpapa as they fled north into Canada, spending the next several years in exile. He finally led his band in to surrender in 1880 and was transferred to the Standing Rock Agency the following year. In a census of the Lakota taken at Standing Rock in September 1881, Rain in the Face's band is recorded as numbering 39 families or 180 people.

Rain-in-the-Face died in his home at the Bullhead Station on the Standing Rock Sioux Reservation after a lengthy illness. On his deathbed he reputedly confessed to a missionary that he thought that he might have killed Custer, shooting him from so close as to leave powder marks upon his face.

== Sources ==
- Grant, Bruce, The Concise Encyclopedia of the American Indian. New York: Wings Books, 2000.
