= Thomas Custer =

American soldier and Medal of Honor recipient

Thomas Ward Custer
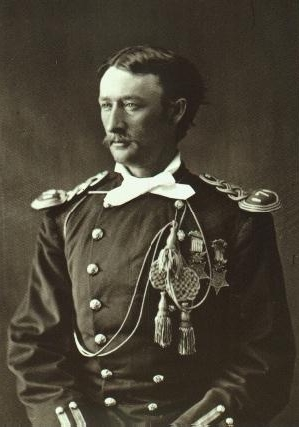
- Captain Thomas W. Custer, two-time Medal of Honor recipient
- Born: March 15, 1845; New Rumley, Ohio, U.S.
- Died: June 25, 1876 (aged 31); Little Bighorn, Montana Territory, U.S.
- Burial place: Fort Leavenworth National Cemetery
- Military career
- Allegiance: United States; Union
- Branch: United States Army; Union Army
- Service years: 1861–1876
- Rank: Captain; Brevet Lieutenant Colonel
- Units: 21st Ohio Volunteer Infantry Regiment; 6th Michigan Volunteer Cavalry Regiment; 7th U.S. Cavalry Regiment
- Commands: Company C, 7th U.S. Cavalry
- Conflicts: American Civil War; Battle of Namozine Church; Battle of Sailor's Creek; Indian Wars; Battle of Washita River; Battle of Honsinger Bluff; Battle of the Little Bighorn †
- Awards: Medal of Honor (twice)

Thomas Ward Custer (March 15, 1845 – June 25, 1876) was a United States Army officer and two-time recipient of the Medal of Honor for bravery during the American Civil War. A younger brother of George Armstrong Custer, he served as his aide at the Battle of Little Bighorn against the Lakota and Cheyenne in the Montana Territory. The two of them, along with their younger brother, Boston Custer, were killed in the overwhelming defeat of United States forces.

== Early life and Civil War ==
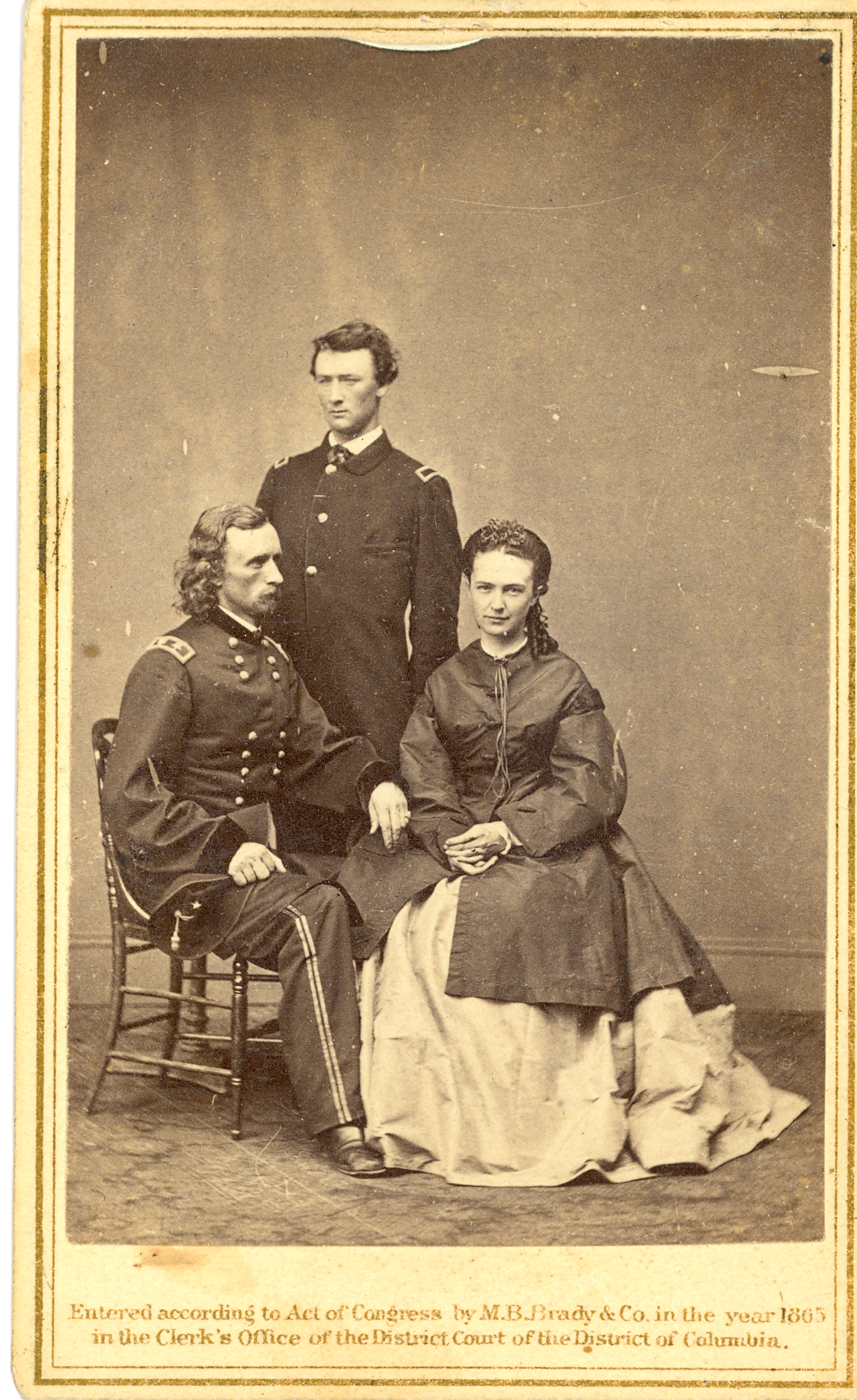
Studio portrait of George Armstrong Custer, Thomas Ward Custer and Elizabeth Bacon Custer, c. 1865

Thomas Custer was born in New Rumley, Ohio, the third son of Emanuel and Marie Custer. The paternal line was of ethnic German descent. He enlisted in the Union Army, in September 1861, at age 16, and served in the early campaigns of the Civil War as a private in the 21st Ohio Volunteer Infantry. He saw action at numerous battles, including Stones River, Missionary Ridge and the Atlanta campaign. He mustered out in October 1864 as a corporal. Commissioned a second lieutenant in Company B of the 6th Michigan Cavalry, he became aide-de-camp to his brother George Armstrong Custer and accompanied him throughout the last year of the war.

Custer distinguished himself by winning successively the brevets of captain, major, and lieutenant colonel, although he was barely 20 years of age when the Civil War ended. He was awarded two Medals of Honor. He was the first soldier to receive the dual honor, one of only four soldiers or sailors to receive the dual honor during the Civil War, and one of just 19 in history.

== Medals of Honor ==
Thomas W. Custer received the Medal of Honor twice for gallantry for his actions during the American Civil War

Both actions that earned Custer the Medal of Honor involved capturing Confederate regimental flags (2nd North Carolina Cavalry flag at Namozine Church on April 3, 1865, and again the flag of the 2nd Virginia Reserves at Sailor's Creek on April 6, 1865). Such battle flags "denoted individual persons, or units, on the field of battle. The flag symbolized the honor of the regiment...In combat, with the field full of noise and smoke, the soldiers watched their regimental flag and if it advanced or retreated they followed. The names of the battles that the regiment participated in were sometimes stitched onto the flag. The loss of a regimental flag was a disgrace to the command."

=== First award ===
Custer earned his first Medal of Honor for actions during the Battle of Namozine Church, April 3, 1865. Among Union forces charging Confederate barricades, Custer had his horse leap a barricade while coming under fire. The Confederates fell back in confusion before him, while he saw a color bearer. Racing forward he seized the flag of the Second North Carolina cavalry from the bearer and commanded those around him to surrender. He took three officers and eleven enlisted men as prisoner, took them back behind the federal column, and requisitioned another horse, as his had been shot during the charge.

=== Second award ===
Similar actions in the Battle of Sailor's Creek resulted in Custer being the first American soldier to receive two Medals of Honor. Riding alongside Colonel Charles E. Capehart when the command to charge was given, he raced his horse toward the enemy barricades through a line of rifle fire, then leapt the barricade to be surrounded by the enemy. He discharged his pistol to both sides, scattering the enemy. He noticed Confederates attempting to make a new battleline and saw the color bearer they were rallying to. Custer charged the bearer. Colonel Capehart reported the rest of the events in a letter to Libbie Custer:

I saw your brother capture his second flag. It was in a charge made by my brigade at Sailor's Creek, Virginia, against General Ewell's Corps. Having crossed the line of temporary works in the flank road, we were confronted by a supporting line. It was from the second line that he wrested the colors, single-handed, and only a few paces to my right. As he approached the colors he received a shot in the face which knocked him back on his horse, but in a moment he was upright in his saddle. Reaching out his right arm, he grasped the flag while the color bearer reeled. The bullet from Tom's revolver must have pierced his heart. As he was falling Captain Custer wrenched the standard from his grasp and bore it away in triumph."

— Colonel Capehart

(Pictures taken shortly after the battle show a scar "with minor soft tissue damage to his lower jaw extending to a point just below the right ear;" though the wound to Tom's face was across blood-rich tissue and covered him in his own blood, had the bullet gone through the mouth or the soft tissue of the neck it would have likely struck a major vessel and have caused him to bleed to death.) Having captured the flag Custer held it aloft and rode back to the Union column. An officer of the Third New Jersey cavalry, seeing Custer ride back with the banner flapping, tried to warn him that he might be shot by his own side: "For God's sake, Tom, furl that flag or they'll fire on you!" Custer ignored him and kept riding towards his brother Armstrong's personal battle flag and handed the captured flag to one of Armstrong's aides while declaring, "Armstrong, the damned rebels shot me, but I've got my flag." Custer turned his horse to rejoin the battle, but Armstrong (who had only seconds before seen another of his aides be shot in the face and fall from his horse dead) ordered Custer to report to the surgeon. Tom ignored the order, so his brother placed him under arrest, ordering him to the rear under guard.

=== Date of actions ===
Until 1948, official references for the date of actions for which Thomas Custer was awarded the Medal of Honor were listed as April 2 and 6, 1865. However, that year a U.S. Army book on Medal of Honor citations listed the dates as May 11, 1863, and April 6, 1865. Consolidated lists of all Medal of Honor citations were published by the U.S. Senate in 1963, 1973, and 1979 with the incorrect first date of May 11, 1863; and in 1963 and 1973 with the correct second date of April 6, 1865. The 1979 edition published the second date as April, 1865, and this would seem to be why the online Army Medal of Honor citations at United States Army Center of Military History has two incorrect dates. The Civil War Army recipient who follows Thomas Custer alphabetically is Byron Cutcheon, whose date of action was May 10, 1863. This may explain how the first date of action for Thomas Custer appeared as May 10, 1863.

== Indian Wars ==
Following the war, Custer was appointed first lieutenant in the 7th Cavalry in 1866. He was wounded in the Washita campaign of the Indian Wars, in November 1868.

He later served with the Army during the Reconstruction era, assigned to keep the peace in South Carolina. He participated in the Yellowstone Expedition of 1873, where he fought in the Battle of Honsinger Bluff, and the Black Hills Expedition of 1874. Custer was appointed captain in 1875 and given command of Company C of the 7th Cavalry. In 1874, at the trading post at Standing Rock Agency, Custer participated in the arrest of chief Rain-in-the-Face (Lakota), suspected in the 1873 murder of Dr. John Honsinger.

During the 1876 Little Bighorn campaign of the Black Hills War, he served as aide-de-camp to his older brother Lt. Col. George A. Custer and died with his brother on June 25, 1876. Lt. Henry Harrington actually led Company C during the battle. George and Thomas' younger brother, Boston Custer, also died in the fighting, as did other Custer relatives and friends. It was widely rumored that Rain-in-the-Face, who had escaped from captivity and participated at the Little Bighorn, cut out Tom Custer's heart after the battle. The chief denied it later during an interview. Custer's corpse was so badly mutilated that the remains were identified only by a recognizable tattoo of his initials on his arm.

Tom Custer was first buried on the battlefield. He was exhumed with other soldiers the next year and reburied in Fort Leavenworth National Cemetery. A stone memorial slab marks the place where his body was discovered and initially buried.

== Possible Cheyenne descendants ==
George Custer was alleged (by Captain Frederick Benteen, chief of scouts Ben Clark, and Cheyenne oral tradition) to have unofficially married Mo-nah-se-tah, daughter of the Cheyenne chief Little Rock, in the winter or early spring of 1868–1869. Mo-nah-se-tah gave birth to a child in January 1869, two months after the Battle of Washita, in which her father was killed. Cheyenne oral history tells that she bore a second child fathered by Custer in late 1869. Some historians believe that George Custer had become sterile after contracting gonorrhea while at West Point, and that the father of these children was his brother Thomas.

== See also ==
- List of Medal of Honor recipients
- List of American Civil War Medal of Honor recipients: A–F

== Bibliography ==
- "Civil War Medal of Honor recipients (A-L)". Medal of Honor citations. United States Army Center of Military History. August 6, 2009. Archived from the original on March 10, 2008.
