= James Calhoun (soldier) =

American soldier (1845–1876)

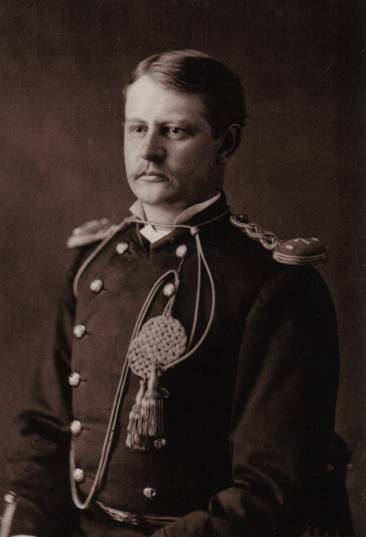
- James Calhoun
- Born: August 24, 1845; Cincinnati, Ohio, U.S.
- Died: June 25, 1876 (aged 30); Little Bighorn, Montana, U.S.
- Burial place: Fort Leavenworth National Cemetery
- Relatives: George A. Custer, brother-in-law Thomas Custer, brother-in-law Boston Custer, brother-in-law
- Military career
- Allegiance: United States
- Branch: United States Army
- Service years: 1864–1876
- Rank: First lieutenant
- Unit: 7th U.S. Cavalry
- Conflicts: Great Sioux War of 1876; Battle of the Little Bighorn †

James Calhoun (August 24, 1845 – June 25, 1876) was a soldier in the United States Army during the American Civil War and the Black Hills War. He was the brother-in-law of George Armstrong Custer and was killed along with Custer in the Battle of the Little Bighorn. His brother-in-law Myles Moylan survived the battle as part of the forces with Major Marcus Reno and Captain Frederick Benteen.

== Early life ==
Calhoun was born in Cincinnati, Ohio into a prestigious and wealthy Scottish-American merchant family that included his brother Frederick. When the American Civil War broke out, he was travelling in Europe and two years later, both joined the Union army. Both brothers were to forgo the merchant life for the frontier to the dismay of their parents.

== Career ==
Upon returning to the United States, he enlisted in the Union Army in 1864. By the end of the war, he was a sergeant.

In July 1867, he was commissioned a second lieutenant in the infantry. He met Margaret Custer while she was visiting the Custers in 1870, and they fell in love. His soon to be brother-in-law George Armstrong Custer had him appointed to first lieutenant in the U.S. 7th Cavalry Regiment, assigned to Company C.

== Personal life ==
Calhoun was known as "The Adonis of the Seventh" due to his handsome features. He was part of the so-called "Custer Clan," which was a clique of close-knit relatives and friends of the former Civil War general. Calhoun was also the brother-in-law of fellow Clan member Myles Moylan. He often wrote letters to his brother and to Margaret, or Maggie as she was called, writing with disdain of his limited understanding of complex native culture, adherents to which naturally resisted military conquest. He often referred to them as "heathens" and desired that one day a post-agricultural population explosion would make hunting-gathering lifestyles unsustainable in the face of Western society.

== Death ==
At the Battle of the Little Bighorn in Montana Territory during the Black Hills War, he was acting as temporary commander of L Company, whose commander was on detached service as aide to General Philip H. Sheridan, and killed along with most of the company. Evidence at the hill where he died, later known as Calhoun Hill, showed that he and his men fought fiercely before they were killed. He and his second in command, Lt. John Crittenden, were found within feet of each other and their men initially had been deployed in a defensive perimeter on the hill. His remains were initially buried on the battlefield, but were reinterred in Fort Leavenworth National Cemetery in Fort Leavenworth, Kansas, in 1877. A marble slab on the Little Bighorn battlefield marks the place where his body was discovered and initially buried.

== Sources and links ==
- Jefferson Country Public Library History Rescue Project: "The Story of the Calhoun Family and General Armstrong Custer"; James Calhoun, Frederick Calhoun and Miles Moylan
- Son of the Morning Star, Evan S. Connell, 1984, ISBN 0-06-097161-4
- Classic Battles: Little Big Horn 1876, Peter Panzieri, 1995, ISBN 1-85532-458-X
- Cavalier in Buckskin, Robert M. Utley, 1988, ISBN 0-8061-2150-5
- Custer: A Soldier's Story, D.A. Kinsley, 1967, ISBN 0-88394-074-4
- The Custer Autograph Album, John M. Carroll, 1994, ISBN 0-932702-97-X
- A Sherlock Holmes Collection, Sir Arthur Conan Doyle,ISBN 978-9963-48-881-0
