= George Yates =

Union Army officer

George Wilhelmus Mancius Yates
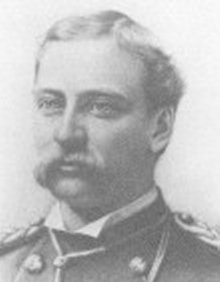
- George Yates
- Born: February 26, 1843; Albany, New York
- Died: June 25, 1876 (aged 33); Little Big Horn, Montana
- Burial place: Fort Leavenworth National Cemetery
- Military career
- Allegiance: United States; Union
- Branch: United States Army; Union Army
- Service years: 1861–1876
- Rank: Captain
- Unit: 7th U.S. Cavalry
- Conflicts: American Civil War First Battle of Manassas Battle of Antietam Battle of Fredericksburg Battle of Gettysburg; American Indian Wars Battle of the Little Big Horn †

George Wilhelmus Mancius Yates (February 26, 1843 – June 25, 1876) was an officer in the U.S. 7th Cavalry Regiment. He was killed in the Battle of the Little Bighorn.

== Biography ==
Yates was born in Albany, New York. He met Custer in Monroe, Michigan, and they became close personal friends. During the American Civil War, Yates was a second lieutenant in the 4th Michigan Infantry. Custer helped him secure a position on General Alfred Pleasonton's staff. Yates earned several brevet promotions in rank for his actions during the war. He fought at the First Battle of Manassas, Antietam, Fredericksburg, and Gettysburg.

After the Civil War, in 1866, Yates was appointed a captain in the 7th Cavalry. He served under Lt. Colonel Custer, commanding F Company. He was a member of the so-called "Custer Clan" or "Custer Gang" of close-knit friends and relatives of the General. Yates was killed during the Battle of the Little Bighorn and fell near Custer. According to some accounts, he is said to have taken command of the battalion after the initial fighting at Medicine Tail Coulee, where Custer may have been wounded. Other accounts suggest that he commanded a wing of Custer's battalion, composed of Companies E and F. He was initially buried on the battlefield, but was reinterred in Fort Leavenworth National Cemetery in Fort Leavenworth, Kansas.

He left a widow and three children. His wife would spend many years as a teacher at the Carlisle Indian School in Carlisle, Pennsylvania. She would later be crushed to death in a New York City Subway accident in 1914. Yates' brother-in-law, Richard Roberts, had accompanied the Custer column as a civilian herder and part-time correspondent for the New York Sun, but had to drop out 70 miles from the Little Bighorn when his pony gave out, thereby perhaps sparing his life.

== Honors ==
Fort Yates in the Dakota Territory was named in his memory and honor, as well as Battery Yates at Fort Baker in Marin County, California, overlooking San Francisco Bay.
