= Charles Varnum =

American army officer

Charles Albert Varnum
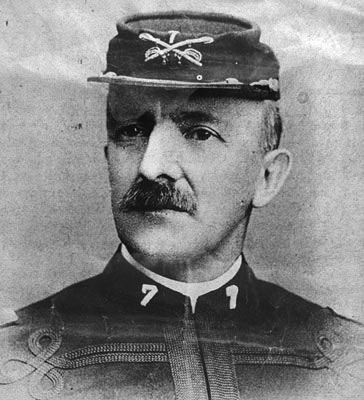
- Born: June 21, 1849; Troy, New York
- Died: February 26, 1936 (aged 86); Letterman Hospital in the Presidio of San Francisco
- Burial place: San Francisco National Cemetery
- Military career
- Allegiance: United States of America
- Branch: United States Army
- Service years: 1872–1908, 1912–1919
- Rank: Colonel
- Units: Company B, US 7th Cavalry
- Conflicts: Battle of the Little Bighorn; Wounded Knee Massacre; Drexel Mission Fight; Philippine–American War; World War I
- Awards: Medal of Honor; Silver Star

Charles Albert Varnum (June 21, 1849 – February 26, 1936) was a career United States Army officer. He was most noted as the commander of the scouts for George Armstrong Custer in the Little Bighorn Campaign (of which he was the last of the surviving officers to die of natural causes) during the Great Sioux War, as well as receiving the Medal of Honor for his actions in a conflict at Drexel Mission following the Wounded Knee Massacre.

== Biography ==
Varnum was born to a prominent military family in Troy, New York. He was the son of Civil War major John Varnum, who relocated to Pensacola, Florida, and became a political and civic figure. Varnum was appointed as a Florida cadet to the United States Military Academy and graduated June 14, 1872. He ranked 17th in a class of 57. Given the brevet rank of second lieutenant, he went to the Dakota Territory of the American West to join Company A of the U.S. 7th Cavalry Regiment. He was involved in a number of expeditions and excursions of the regiment, including the Yellowstone Expedition (1873) and Black Hills Expedition (1874). He and the regiment were stationed at Fort Abraham Lincoln.

Varnum received the Medal of Honor for gallantry for his actions at White Clay Creek

With the eruption of the latest round of the Sioux Wars in 1876, Varnum accompanied the 7th Cavalry as it proceeded overland from Fort Lincoln to the Yellowstone River, and then to the mouth of the Rosebud. Varnum was in charge of the scouts, who were civilians, army personnel, Crow Indians, and Arikaree Indians. His duty was to delegate scouting missions and coordinate the resulting reports. During the Little Bighorn expedition, Varnum and the Crow scouts in his unit and a few Arikaras discovered the location of a huge Indian village with hundreds of lodges. Arikara scout Red Star carried the news to Custer and brought him up to a prominent point known as the Crow's Nest to show him the enormousness of the encampment, but Custer could not spot what his scouts were seeing. Ignoring their warning, Custer developed a battle plan and decided to attack. Some of Varnum's Indian scouts departed, while others began chanting their death songs and adorning themselves for battle. Several would die in the subsequent fighting. Varnum accompanied the troops of Marcus Reno and Frederick Benteen and survived the battle.

Varnum served as Regimental Quartermaster from November 1876 through October 1879. In 1877, he participated in the Nez Perce War, fighting at the Battle of Canyon Creek, as well as the Battle of Bear Paw from September 30,–October 4, 1877. He continued to serve on the frontier in various forts and married Mary Alice Moore (1865–1935). They had three children, one of whom died two weeks after being born in 1889.

In 1890, Captain Varnum commanded Company B of the 7th Cavalry at the Wounded Knee Massacre on December 29, against the aging Sioux Chief Big Foot and some 350 of his followers. The following day, during the Drexel Mission Fight at White Clay Creek, his heroics helped ensure a safe withdrawal for his troops. For his action, he received the Army Medal of Honor for Most Distinguished Gallantry on September 22, 1897.

Varnum was promoted to major on February 1, 1901, then transferred to the 4th Cavalry and promoted to lieutenant colonel in April 1905. He sailed under orders for the Philippines from San Francisco in September 1905. Varnum received a Silver Star Citation for gallantry in action. He was retired from the Regular Army for disability on October 31, 1907, continued serving with Idaho militia troops for another year. After leaving active service, Varnum was a professor of military science at the University of Maine, and from 1912, he served as a recruiting officer in the reserves. He was recalled to active duty and promoted to colonel during World War I as finance and disbursing officer at Fort Mason, California. He retired again on April 8, 1919.

He was a hereditary companion of the Military Order of the Loyal Legion of the United States.

When he died in 1936 at Letterman Hospital in the Presidio of San Francisco at the age of 86, Varnum was the last surviving officer of those who had participated in the Battle of the Little Bighorn, although not the last surviving combatant. He was buried in the San Francisco National Cemetery.

On July 24, 2024, U.S. Secretary of Defense Lloyd Austin announced a review of twenty Medals of Honor awarded for the Wounded Knee Massacre, including Captain Varnum's, although Varnum's award was, unlike the other nineteen soldiers listed for review, for actions at the Drexel Mission Fight on White Clay Creek the day after Wounded Knee.

== Medal of Honor citation ==
Rank and organization: Captain, Company B, 7th U.S. Cavalry. Place and date: At White Clay Creek, S. Dak., December 30, 1890. Entered service at: Pensacola, Fla. Birth: Troy, N.Y. Date of issue: September 22, 1897.

Citation:

While executing an order to withdraw, seeing that a continuance of the movement would expose another troop of his regiment to being cut off and surrounded, he disregarded orders to retire, placed himself in front of his men, led a charge upon the advancing Indians, regained a commanding position that had just been vacated, and thus insured a safe withdrawal of both detachments without further loss.

== See also ==
- List of Medal of Honor recipients
- List of Medal of Honor recipients for the Indian Wars
