= Frederick Benteen =

United States Army officer (1834–1898)

Frederick William Benteen
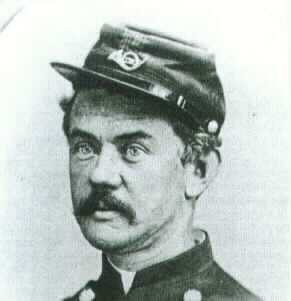
- Frederick Benteen circa 1865
- Born: August 24, 1834; Petersburg, Virginia, US
- Died: June 22, 1898 (aged 63); Atlanta, Georgia, US
- Burial place: Initially Atlanta, Georgia reinterred in Arlington National Cemetery
- Military career
- Allegiance: United States; Union
- Branch: United States Army; Union Army
- Service years: 1861–1888
- Rank: Colonel (Union Army); Major (Regular Army); Brigadier General (Brevet)
- Commands: 10th Missouri Cavalry; 138th U.S. Colored Infantry; 'H' Company, 7th U.S. Cavalry
- Conflicts: American Civil War; Battle of Wilson's Creek; Battle of Pea Ridge; Milliken's Bend; Battle of Pleasant Hill; Siege of Vicksburg; Battle of Westport; Battle of Mine Creek; Battle of Columbus; Indian Wars; Battle of the Washita; Battle of the Little Bighorn; Battle of Canyon Creek

Frederick William Benteen (August 24, 1834 – June 22, 1898) was a military officer who first fought during the American Civil War. He was appointed to commanding ranks during the Indian Campaigns and Great Sioux War against the Lakota and Northern Cheyenne. Benteen is best known for being in command of a battalion (Companies D, H,& K) of the 7th U. S. Cavalry at the Battle of the Little Bighorn in late June, 1876.

After scouting the area of the left flank as ordered, Captain Benteen received a note from his superior officer George Armstrong Custer ordering him to quickly bring up the ammunition packs and join him in Custer's surprise attack on a large Native American encampment. Benteen's failure to promptly comply with Custer's orders is one of the most controversial aspects of the famed battle. The fight resulted in the death of Custer and the complete annihilation of the five companies of cavalrymen which comprised Custer's detachment, but Benteen's relief of Major Marcus Reno's battalion may have saved them from annihilation.

Benteen subsequently served in the U.S. Cavalry another 12 years, being both honored by promotion and disgraced with a conviction for drunkenness by a military tribunal. He retired for health reasons in 1888, and lived a further decade until his death from natural causes at age 63.

== Early life and career ==
Frederick Benteen was born August 24, 1834, in Petersburg, Virginia, to Theodore Charles Benteen and his wife Caroline (Hargrove) Benteen. Benteen's paternal ancestors had emigrated to America from the Netherlands in the 18th century, settling in Baltimore, Maryland. Theodore and Caroline moved their family to Virginia from Baltimore shortly after the birth of their first child, Henrietta Elizabeth, in October 1831. Frederick Benteen was educated at the Petersburg Classical Institute, where he was first trained in military drill. His family moved to St. Louis, Missouri, in 1849.

The election of Abraham Lincoln as U.S. president in 1860 polarized the country and the state. While a slave state, Missouri had many Union sympathizers and active abolitionists. Theodore Charles Benteen, an ardent secessionist, vehemently opposed his son's associating with Unionists. A family crisis was ignited when Frederick joined the Union Army on September 1, 1861, as a first lieutenant in the 1st Missouri Cavalry Regiment. (Len Eagleburger's book places Benteen at the Battle of Wilson's Creek in August 1861.) The 1st Missouri Volunteer Cavalry was often referred to as "Bowen's Battalion." It was later redesignated as the 9th and then merged into the 10th Missouri Cavalry.

Benteen participated in numerous battles during the American Civil War, among them the battles of Wilson's Creek, Pea Ridge, Vicksburg, and Westport. On February 27, 1864, Benteen was promoted to lieutenant colonel and commander of the 10th Missouri Cavalry. Benteen was mustered out at the war's end on June 30, 1865.

Shortly thereafter he was appointed to the rank of colonel as commander of the 138th Infantry Regiment, U.S. Colored Troops. He led the regiment from July 1865 to January 6, 1866, when it was mustered out. Later that year, he was appointed a captain in the 7th U.S. Cavalry. Meanwhile, the Senate finally approved awards of brevet ranks to distinguished veterans of the Civil War. Benteen received brevets of major for the Battle of Mine Creek and lieutenant colonel for the Battle of Columbus (1865).

== 7th Cavalry service under Custer ==
In January 1867, Benteen departed for his new assignment with the 7th US Cavalry Regiment and its field commander Lt. Col. George Armstrong Custer. He was assigned to this regiment for 16 years, through many of the Indian Wars. Until 1882, except for periods of leave and detached duty, Benteen commanded H Troop of the 7th US Cavalry.

On January 30, 1867, Benteen made a customary courtesy call to the quarters of Custer and his wife Elizabeth. Benteen said later that he regarded Custer as a braggart from their first meeting (and his dislike deepened throughout his years of service under the man). Meanwhile, on March 27, 1867, Benteen's wife gave birth to their son in Atlanta.

Following the Civil War, the Cheyenne Indians represented the greatest threat on the Kansas frontier. In late July 1868, Benteen led an expedition to provide security for the Indian agents near Fort Larned. On August 13, Benteen, commanding 30 troopers, encountered a Cheyenne raiding party along the banks of Elk Horn Creek near Fort Zarah. He charged into a force of what appeared to be about fifty warriors. To Benteen's surprise, he next discovered more than 200 Cheyenne raiding a ranch. Benteen pursued the Cheyenne without rest until dark, engaging them throughout the day without respite. This first undisputed victory of the 7th US Cavalry brought Benteen a brevet to colonel and the adoration of the settlers of central Kansas.

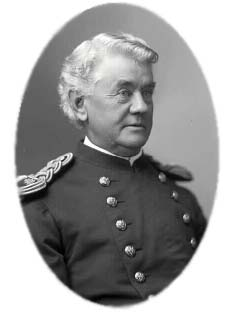
Frederick Benteen in his later years

On October 13, Benteen and his men were assigned to escort a wagon train loaded with weapons and ammunition meant for the regiment. They reached the wagon train just as a war party began to attack. Benteen drove off the warriors, saving the wagon train from capture. Later following the trail of the raiding party, the 7th US Cavalry came upon a Cheyenne encampment on the Washita River in the Indian Territory.

In response to the continued Cheyenne raids, General Philip Sheridan devised a plan of punitive reprisals. His troops would respond to Indian attacks by entering their winter encampments, destroying supplies and livestock, and killing those who resisted. The cavalry was directed to travel in the dead of winter through a largely uncharted region, which required daring leadership. Sheridan turned to Lt. Col. George Armstrong Custer, who was brought back early from his court-martial and given the mission. Sheridan trusted only Custer with such a deed, and in November 1868 Custer returned to his regiment under special orders from Sheridan.

On November 23, 1868, Custer left Camp Supply with 11 of the 12 Companies of the 7th US Cavalry (Company L was left on garrison duty in Kansas) heading toward the Washita River. On November 27, the 7th surrounded a Cheyenne encampment at the river. Just before dawn, Custer launched a four-pronged assault on the village, known as the Battle of Washita River.

As captain of H Company, Benteen led a squadron of Major Joel Elliott's command during the attack. His horse was shot from under him by a son of Cheyenne Chief Black Kettle. The boy was about fourteen years old and was armed only with a revolver. Benteen yelled he would spare the boy's life if he dropped the revolver, and made the peace sign. In reply, the boy aimed his revolver at Benteen and fired. The bullet missed, so the boy fired again, and the bullet passed through the sleeve of Benteen's coat. The boy fired a third time, although Benteen was making friendly overtures. This bullet hit Benteen's horse, killing it, and pitching Benteen into the snow. When the Indian boy raised his pistol to fire once more, Benteen finally shot him dead.

Custer, in his battle report to Sheridan, made little reference to US casualties. During the action itself, the 7th lost only one man killed - Captain Louis Hamilton of Company A - and seven wounded. However, shortly after the battle, Major Elliott and 17 men apparently all volunteers from various companies, had pursued escaping warriors down the south bank of the river and had yet to return: as such they were all posted as missing. It later emerged that Elliott (who rode off with the cry "Here's for a brevet or a coffin!") along with all his men, had been surrounded and killed by the Cheyenne, Arapaho and Kiowa Indians, who on hearing the sounds of the engagement, were coming from the several larger encampments further down the river towards Black Kettle's village. Custer had been unaware of these larger numbers of Indians only some three to four miles away at the time he attacked Black Kettle's camp, as he had neglected to scout in that direction. Shortly after Elliott had left, 1st Lieutenant Edward Godfrey, Captain West's second in command in Company K, had reported to Custer that whilst he had also been pursuing some escaping Indians along the north bank of the Washita River, some two miles or so east of the village, he had heard extensive shooting coming from the south side, but was unable to see what was happening because of dense tree cover along both banks. Godfrey had to retreat soon afterwards as he also ran into substantial numbers of Cheyenne, Arapaho and Kiowas now approaching from the much larger complex of encampments lower down the river.

Custer claimed that he sent Captain Edward Myers of Company E and some troops in a search for Elliot and his men along the south bank of the river. Lieutenant Godfrey somewhat disputes this however. He stated that "that he (Myers) did not go down the valley any distance else he would have discovered Elliott." It is thought that Elliott and his small command held out for at least two hours before they were finally overwhelmed. If correct, this throws further doubt as to the veracity of the Myers search claim because there would still have been sounds of shooting coming from the lower valley which Myers would surely have heard at the time that he was supposedly despatched by Custer. In the meantime Custer did however issue orders for the complete destruction of Black Kettle's camp, with troops burning several dozen tepees, destroying tons of food, clothing, weapons and other equipment, and deliberately shooting about 800 Indian ponies over a period of about two hours, the same length of time it is thought that Elliott and his men held out for. Benteen claimed that he remonstrated with Custer, particularly over the method of despatching the ponies. There was a considerable amount of lead flying around from several squads of men firing at the herd which Benteen thought endangered other troops, including his own, still holding the perimeter of the village opposite. He claimed that he received a sarcastic reply from Custer, and that during this orgy of destruction Elliot was forgotten.

It is understandable therefore that Benteen regarded Custer's actions at the Washita as totally unprofessional and never forgave him. Elliott was a close friend of Benteen's and he wasn't just any missing Officer with a few troops, he was a very senior Officer, Custer's deputy who had commanded the regiment with distinction after Custer himself was court-martialled and suspended from duty and rank following General Hancock's campaign against the Cheyennes the previous year. The charge was that Custer had ignored the plight of several missing troops during that campaign, and had then left his regiment in the field whilst on active duty to travel hundreds of miles east across Kansas to meet up with his wife who had just arrived in the territory. Abandoned might possibly be too strong a word to use in this context, but the term crops up several times over the course of Custer's career.

On reviewing Officer reports of the battle on the return of the regiment to Camp Supply, General Sheridan evinced concern over the fate of Major Elliott and his men, and their loss was viewed a significant defect in the Washita operation. The bodies of Elliott and his men were not discovered until 2 weeks later when the same eleven companies 7th Cavalry under Custer, now reinforced by ten companies of the 19th Kansas Volunteer Cavalry and one of the 10th Cavalry, accompanied by General Sheridan himself, again took to the field in pursuit of hostile Indians in their winter camps south of the River Arkansas. On the morning of 9 December 1868 a small group of Officers, including Sheridan and Custer, and a small escort of troops under Captain George Yates discovered the site. Elliott's body was recovered and transported back to camp, before onward passage to his family via Fort Arbuckle, but the bodies of the troopers were buried together on a nearby knoll overlooking the Washita Valley. There was no service.

The Elliott affair soon became one of nagging controversy and would not disappear; aspects of it would haunt the regiment, as well as perceptions of Custer's leadership for years to come, up to and including the Little Big Horn in 1876.

Benteen was more forthright and concluded that Custer had abandoned Elliott and wrote to a friend criticizing him over this. The letter was passed to the St. Louis Democrat newspaper and published without Benteen's permission or name. On its publication Custer called the officers together and threatened to 'horsewhip' the author. Without revealing that the letter had been published without his knowledge or permission, Benteen admitted authorship, albeit with a hand on his pistol. Custer appears to have been quite taken aback by learning that this previously quiet, gentlemanly Officer, who had never been known to raise his voice had written the letter, but he could plainly see the tall, husky man before him, every bit as big as himself, and who was also toying with his revolver. Custer did not attempt a whipping but dismissed the matter with a curt "Mister Benteen, I will see you later"

It seems that Custer never mentioned it again, but it was the low point in the Custer-Benteen relationship and goes a long way towards explaining later events. Despite the widening rift between them, Benteen never sought to transfer out of the regiment. "I had far too much pride," Benteen was quoted as saying "to permit Custer.... driving me from the regiment." There is also evidence to suggest that Custer did not reciprocate Benteen's loathing. Even Benteen recognised this. After Custers death Benteen stated "I always surmised what I afterwards learned, that he wanted me badly as a friend, but I could not be."

After the Washita encounter Benteen, and the rest of the 7th Cavalry, spent much of the winter of 1868-9 in the field. During that time they helped in the construction of a new post east of the Wichita Mountains, originally designated New Fort Cobb. Many 7th Cavalry officers, including Benteen, wanted it named Fort Elliott in honour of their recently fallen comrade. Other regiments based there however had other proposals and General Sherman finally intervened naming the post Fort Sill in honour of a former West Point classmate of his who had been killed in the Civil War. The name endures to this day.

In early March 1869, the 7th left Fort Sill in search of a number of Indian bands that had still not enrolled on the established reservations. On 15 March, they discovered a camp of about 200 tepees on Sweetwater Creek in the Texas Panhandle, southwest of the old Washita battleground. Custer decided to go into the village accompanied only by Lieutenant Cooke and an army Doctor, leaving the regiment under Benteen's command some distance away. Realising his mistake, Custer sent Cooke back to Benteen with instructions to bring the regiment forward. As Benteen arrived close to the village a large force of warriors surrounded the column. He halted and following standard cavalry tactics threw out a skirmish line, and after a long stand-off the Indians suddenly dispersed, many to a yet larger village about 15 miles away. Custer re-joined the regiment and it immediately set off to the second village, where after another stand-off, during which he threatened to hang several Indians, Custer negotiated the release of three captive white women.

At the end of March, the 7th turned north headed for summer posts in Kansas. Despite the fact that Benteen's wife was seriously ill, and having recently also lost an infant girl, Custer insisted that Benteen remain at Fort Dodge and report for duty under Major Henry Douglass of the 3rd Infantry. However, unbeknown to Custer, Douglass had recently been put on the army's Unassigned List, and he promptly signed over the post and its property to Benteen on 9 April 1869. Benteen took advantage of his new position as commanding officer at Fort Dodge to approve a brief assignment for himself to Fort Harker on detached service until mid May. At Fort Harker he was reunited with his sick wife and only surviving child Freddie. He then arranged for them to visit relatives in St Louis for a summer recuperation before collecting some H Company property still at Fort Harker and returning to Fort Dodge.

On his return to Fort Dodge, he was visited by Colonel William G. Mitchell, the inspector general for the department, who was surprised to see Benteen there. Mitchell told Benteen that he would sort the situation on his return to Fort Leavenworth. He was as good as his word, and Benteen soon received new orders. On 2 June Company H left Fort Dodge for the last time and marched to the cavalry camp at Fort Hays arriving on 8 June. At this time, Benteen also learned that the 7th Cavalry was to have a new Colonel, with Samuel D. Sturgis, replacing Andrew J. Smith. Benteen knew Sturgis from Civil War days and had a fairly low opinion of him, but for Benteen his appointment was better than giving Custer a promotion into that position.

In March 1870, with Benteen and Company H still at Fort Hays, a new major reported for duty with the 7th Cavalry - Major Marcus A. Reno. He and Benteen clashed almost at once and even got into a brawl following a drinking session at the Post Trader's. Shortly afterwards Benteen was granted leave to see his wife and son in St Louis for the first time in nine months. On his return to Fort Hays he was put on detached service until early July, after which he left to join his company, which had been patrolling for some weeks under Major Joseph G. Tilford and Lieutenant Brewster. The company remained at a camp on the Big Sandy River all summer, and it was not until the early fall that Benteen brought it back to Fort Hays, where they stayed all the winter of 1870-71.

In February 1871, the 7th Cavalry was deployed to several locations across the former Confederate States on policing duty. Custer tried to manipulate the stationing of Benteen's Company H in favour of his brother Tom's Company M, but after an intervention by Colonel Sturgis, Company H was posted to Nashville, and remained there for almost the entire 2 years the regiment was in the South.

In April 1873, the entire 7th Cavalry was transferred to Dakota Territory, garrisoning posts along the Missouri River, whilst preparations were made for summer campaigning. Companies D and I under Major Reno were sent north to Fort Pembina as escort for a party of international boundary surveyors whilst the other ten Companies assembled at Fort Rice in mid June. On 20 June what became known as the Yellowstone Expedition under Colonel David S. Stanley left Fort Rice as protection for the surveyors of the Northern Pacific Railroad now beginning to work its way across the Yellowstone area of Montana. As well as ten Companies of the 7th Cavalry, Stanley also had no less than 19 Infantry Companies under his command. On 31 July Benteen was detached from the main command. Some infantry were deployed to a supply point about 20 miles upstream from Glendive Creek, known as Stanley's Stockade, and Companies H and C of the 7th Cavalry under Benteen were detailed as mobile and scouting support. In mid September, having clashed with Sioux warriors at the confluence of the Yellowstone and Tongue Rivers, and again near the mouth of the Big Horn River, suffering some minor casualties on both occasions, Custer and Stanley returned to the Stanley Stockade and the reunited expedition, returned to Fort Rice, arriving on 22 September. The Companies of the 7th then began dispersing to the various posts that had been assigned for winter quarters. Benteen's Company H as well as Companies C, K and M remained at Fort Rice under Major Tilford. Benteen was no great friend of Tilford but it appears that they spent several drinking sessions together that winter.

The 7th Cavalry came together again at Fort Lincoln in June 1874 to prepare for the Black Hills Expedition. The official reason for the expedition was to scout the area with a view to establishing a new Fort, but Custer with General Sheridan's full knowledge and approval, decided to take several miners with him who, as expected, spent all their time searching for gold. There is good reason to believe that Sheridan hoped gold would be found and that the resultant flow of white miners into the area would give him a justification for breaking up the large Sioux Indian Reservation there. Ten Companies of the 7th, bolstered by two infantry Companies for camp and wagon security departed on 2 July. Companies D and I remained on boundary survey escort duty under Reno, as they had the previous year. The expedition was prepared for hostilities but it turned out to be little more than an extended picnic, and traces of gold was found in some places. On the way back, however, the column came across an abandoned Indian camp site and most agreed that it was the largest that they had ever seen. One of the scouts, Luther North, remarked that Custer was lucky that he had not found the camp still occupied. With a comment that would later come back to haunt the regiment, Custer apparently replied brusquely that the 7th Cavalry could whip any concentration of Indians anywhere. Benteen's thoughts on the matter are not recorded.

Immediately on returning to Fort Rice in late August 1874, two Companies of the 7th were despatched to Louisiana, again on policing duties. Company K went to Shreveport whilst Benteen's Company H was deployed to New Orleans. Benteen's men left Fort Rice on 2 September and remained in the south until the following spring, thus avoiding the harshness of another Dakota winter that year. Back in Dakota in July 1875, Benteen commanded a battalion comprising his own Company H, Tom McDougall's E Company and Myles Moylan's A Company on an extended patrol to evict miners from the Black Hills, drawn there as expected by the rumours of gold put about after Custer's 1874 expedition. It was an impossible task as the numbers of miners had already swollen to many thousands although Benteen did manage to escort a small number back to Fort Randall which left a lasting impression on a number of Sioux Indians. On 20 September, Benteen left Fort Randall for winter quarters at Fort Rice, where he found himself as post commander as Major Tilford had taken extended leave of absence.

In December 1875, Captains Thompson and Hart both left the regiment and Benteen became the ranking, or senior, Captain of the 7th Cavalry, a position he held until he was promoted to Major in the 9th Cavalry, effective 17 December 1882.

== Little Bighorn ==
Captain Benteen still commanded Company H of the Seventh US Cavalry regiment during an 1876 expedition to find the "winter roaming" Lakota Sioux, Northern Cheyenne and Arapaho of the Northern Plains, and finally force them onto reservations. The overall plan was to trap the Indians, who had by this time also been joined by large numbers of "summer roamers" from the reservations, between three army columns converging on the unceded territory south of the Yellowstone River, which included the Powder, Tongue and Big Horn drainage systems. The Dakota column, which included the whole of the 7th Cavalry, was under the command of General Alfred Terry. It moved westwards from Fort Lincoln meeting the Montana column under Colonel John Gibbon, that had moved east from Forts Shaw and Ellis along the north bank of the Yellowstone. At the mouth of the Rosebud in mid June Terry assumed overall command. Meanwhile, the Wyoming column under General George Crook had moved north-eastwards from Fort Fetterman on the North Platte, but unbeknown to Terry and Gibbon he had been repulsed by the Indians at the Battle of the Rosebud, and had withdrawn to re-supply.

An earlier six day scout by Major Reno and six Companies of the 7th Cavalry through the Powder, Tongue and lower Rosebud country had discovered many Indian trails converging towards the upper Rosebud and Little Big Horn valleys. At the mouth of the Rosebud, therefore, Terry detached the whole of the 7th Cavalry under Custer with orders to scout southwards along the Rosebud valley to its headwaters and thence over the divide into the upper Little Big Horn valley, there to provide a blocking force against which the Terry and Gibbon columns, moving from the Yellowstone, would drive any Indians that were located along the lower Little Big Horn.

Ironically, while Gibbon had still been moving along the upper Yellowstone in late April / early May he had despatched Captain Edward Ball with two Companies (F & H) of the 2nd Cavalry on a scout up the Big Horn River. Ball went as far as old Fort C.F. Smith which had been abandoned in 1868 and from there he crossed the divide eastwards into the upper Little Big Horn valley. Moving downstream he passed under the same bluffs upon which six weeks later Benteen's troops would join Reno's defeated battalion. Ball then camped on the very site later occupied by the huge Indian village which Custer attacked. Finally, he crossed another watershed to the east and marched down Tullock's Creek to re-join Gibbon on the Yellowstone, without seeing any Indians.

At dawn on 25 June 1876, from a high point called the Crows Nest on the Rosebud / Little Big Horn watershed, Custer's scouts spotted signs of a large Indian encampment approximately 12 to 15 miles away to the north in the lower Little Bighorn River valley. Having already not gone as far up the Rosebud as Terry intended, Custer also then decided not to wait for Terry's and Gibbon's joint column, which by this time was beginning its advance as planned up the Little Big Horn from the Yellowstone River towards the Indian camp. Fearing that he might be discovered, but without knowing how big the Indian camp was, Custer made the fateful decision that he would attack it immediately with his 7th Cavalry.

Still approximately 12 miles from the Little Bighorn River, Custer divided his force into three battalions and reinforced the escort for the Pack Train being protected by Company B by ordering the addition of one non-commissioned officer and six men from each company. He assigned Major Reno a battalion of three companies (A, G & M) and Benteen as senior captain command of a battalion comprising Companies D, H and K. Custer retained command of the remaining five companies (C, E, F, I & L). He immediately tasked Benteen with searching on the left flank and securing any possible escape route. Benteen searched fruitlessly through rough ground for about two hours before returning to the trail of the main column. At a marshy crossing of Reno Creek ("the morass"), he stopped twenty minutes to water the horses. Some of his officers were concerned with the delay; one asked, "I wonder what the old man is keeping us here for." Just before leaving, they heard the sound of gunfire in the distance. Captain Thomas Weir was already mounted at the head of the column. Pointing ahead, he said of Custer's companies, "They ought to be over there," and started his company forward. Benteen ordered the rest of the battalion to advance.

As they approached the Little Bighorn River, Benteen was met by Sergeant Kanipe carrying a message from Custer to the Pack Train commander, Lieutenant Edward Mathey, soon followed by Trumpeter Martin with a message specifically for Benteen, saying that a big village had been found and that Benteen should immediately come up. The note delivered to Benteen read: "Come on. Big village. Be quick. Bring packs. PS: Bring packs." The slow pack mules, carrying the reserve ammunition had reached the marsh and were slaking their thirst. After first waiting for the pack train, Benteen decided to move on without them.

At this point it is important to examine why Benteen made this and subsequent decisions for which he has been somewhat unfairly criticised.

Very few apart from Benteen himself seem to have recognised the inherent illogic in Custers last instructions to him. Firstly at the time he issued the orders delivered separately by Kanipe and Martin, Custer had no idea where the Pack Train or Benteen's battalion were and whether they were anywhere near each other. Custer had sent Benteen off to the left (south) to scout the valleys and ridges leading to the upper Little Big Horn Valley, with instructions to pitch into anything he came across. He therefore didn't know whether Benteen had also been engaged by Indians, and if he had how did he expect Benteen with a much smaller battalion (3 companies) than Custer had retained for himself (5 companies) to be able to come to his aid. As it was Benteen had not found anything, and on his own initiative had returned to the main trail and was still some distance ahead of the slow moving Pack Train when he reached the watering point of the morass. At this point it should also be remembered that Benteen was unaware that following his departure on his scout, Custer had further split his command by sending Major Reno with his battalion of 3 companies into the valley to charge the Indian village.

Secondly, as Benteen immediately recognised on reading the orders, a fully loaded pack mule cannot move forward at anything like the pace of a cavalry troop going at a fast trot, let alone at a canter or a gallop. There is no way therefore that Benteen, even when he was close to the Pack Train, could have followed the instructions "Be quick. Bring packs" as the two things were not mutually compatible. As Benteen told both Captain Weir and Lieutenant Edgerly who had joined him at the head of the column after Martin's arrival "Well If he wants me in a hurry, how does he expect me to bring the packs. If I am going to be of service to him, I think I had better not wait for the packs" He therefore did the only thing a sensible field commander could do in those circumstances and that was to issue instructions to the Pack Train commander to follow as quickly as possible whilst himself heading off as expeditiously as he could because he knew, that even if he met up with Custer, the only ammunition he had in his battalion was the personal issue of each of his troopers, and that until the Pack Train came up there was very little available to replenish anything that had been expended by Custer's men.

Of course, the whole situation changed when Benteen, having come across a split trail, guessed correctly in following that made by Custer up over the high ground to the east of the valley, rather than that of Major Marcus Reno who crossed the river into the valley bottom. Reno and his battalion had then attacked the southwest corner of the large village, farther down the Little Bighorn River, but had been routed with heavy casualties. The tattered remains of the battalion struggled to recross the river and climb the bluffs, pursued by many warriors. Benteen met up with the remnants of the battalion just as he reached the top of what is now Reno Hill, and the Major called out "For God's sake Benteen. Halt your command and help me. I've lost half my men"

Benteen immediately set about stabilising the situation on the hilltop by deploying his men as defensive skirmishers, and with more and more of Reno's demoralised men eventually reaching the position, he began assessing the state of the now joint command. Many of Reno's men were wounded and some of the fit ones had lost their weapons and horses. Most were also low on or completely out of ammunition. Benteen gave instruction to his men to share out their personal allocation of ammunition to Reno's men but he knew that until the Pack Train arrived with reserve ammunition, equipment and some spare horses there was no question of proceeding further along the trail towards Custer, wherever he was. Benteen conferred with Reno and it was decided to send Lieutenant Hare back along the trail to the Pack Train - which was still several miles away - with orders to cut out one or two ammunition mules and return as quickly as possible.

Ironically, it is possible that by this time, Custer had already been told by his scout Mitch Bouyer that Reno had been defeated in the valley, because he and Crow scout Curly had seen the retreat from their scouting position on what later became known as Weir ridge. Despite a long conversation between Custer and Bouyer, there is no evidence to suggest that Custer even thought about moving back to Reno's relief. In pursuit of his own objectives (whatever they may have been) it appears from this evidence that Custer was prepared at least initially to abandon Reno to his fate.

It is interesting to note that of the twelve 7th Cavalry Company commanders at the Little Big Horn, many had been with Custer at the Battle of the Washita nearly 8 years previously. Three of them, Benteen himself (Co. H), Captain Thomas Weir (Co. D) and Lieutenant Edward Godfrey (Co. K) were in Benteen's battalion which came to Reno's relief. (Godfrey was the second in command of Co. K at the Washita, under Captain Robert West). Other Little Big Horn Company commanders who were at the Washita included Lieutenant Donald McIntosh (Co. G) who was killed in Reno's retreat from the valley, and Captain George Yates (Co. F), Captain Tom Custer (Co. C) and Lieutenant Algernon Smith (Co. E) all of whom died with Custer. Captain Myles Keogh (Co. I) who also died with Custer, was on detached service with Colonel Alfred Sully at Fort Harker at the time of the Washita engagement. Although present, neither Tom Custer, Algernon Smith nor Donald McIntosh were Company commanders at the Washita. Other Officers who were at the Washita but also not company commanders there included Custer's adjutant Lieutenant William Cooke, Lieutenant Edward Mathey, who now commanded the Pack Train, and Lieutenant Frank Gibson, who was Benteen's deputy in Co. H. All the other Washita Company commanders had by now retired, died or had been reassigned to different regiments. It is highly likely that on reaching Reno and being appraised of how Custer had divided his forces further after Benteen had been sent on his scout to the left, that he in particular, as the most experienced Officer present, recognised the same tactics that Custer had used at the Washita. An enveloping attack on an unsuspecting Indian village by two or more columns (unbeknown to Benteen, Custer had later further split his battalion into two squadrons led by Yates and Keogh), and the attempted separation of the non-combatants and pony herds from the main body of warriors.

At the Washita however Custer had got lucky. He had attacked a relative small camp of Cheyennes under Black Kettle that was some 3 to 4 miles west of the main encampments of Cheyennes, Arapahos, Kiowas and Commanches. He had failed to adequately scout the whole of the Washita valley to establish exactly what he was up against, but was able to overcome Black Kettle's camp containing relatively few warriors, and establish a defensive position, before the hundreds of warriors from the downstream villages could organise. He managed to extricate his command towards the end of the day in the growing darkness as the potential seriousness of his situation emerged. He did however abandon his second in command Major Elliot and 17 troopers.

At the Little Big Horn Custer again failed to adequately scout to establish the size of the Indian encampment, but this time he and his battalion were not so lucky. It is likely that on meeting up with Reno and his battered battalion on the hilltop, and realising the size of the Indian village, Benteen recognised the similarity to the Washita, and not knowing where Custer and his five companies were, or even if they were engaging the Indians, he was concerned that he and the remaining companies of the 7th and the Pack Train were about suffer the same abandonment fate as Major Elliot, only on a much larger scale.

Benteen has been criticized by some military analysts because he failed to obey (Custer's) instructions. He received the note, he read it, he thought enough of it to tuck it in a pocket, but he did not get the ammunition packs and rush forward to Custer's aid. Instead, as he approached the battleground after his scouting trip he saw Major Reno's demoralized men attempting to organize a defensive position on the bluff and he chose to join them. This decision assured Custer's death. It would seem, therefore, that Benteen must be condemned; yet if he had tried to carry out the order it is possible his three companies would have been hacked to pieces en route. Then Reno's weakened command surely would have collapsed, and when General Terry arrived he would count every single man of the Seventh Cavalry dead.

Benteen explained to the 1879 Court of Inquiry why he did what he did, and his reasoning is equally clear from subsequent remarks. He thought it impossible to obey; to do so would have been suicide. "We were at their hearths and homes," he said, referring to the Sioux, "their medicine was working well, and they were fighting for all the good God gives anyone to fight for."

— Evan S. Connell in Son of the Morning Star

Shortly after Benteen's battalion arrived, the men on the hilltop noticed that the pursuing warriors began to turn away from them and head north. Three miles back, Captain Thomas McDougall, marching with the pack train, heard gunfire, "a dull sound that resounded through the hills". The troops with Benteen and Reno—even Lieutenant Edward Settle Godfrey, who was deaf in one ear—also heard it. Both Reno and Benteen claimed they never heard it. Further, they did not at once advance to find out, which would later give rise to charges that they had abandoned Custer.

After a delay of at least half an hour waiting for the Pack Train, and without orders Captain Weir rode north about a mile toward the sound of gunfire to the present-day Weir Point, followed by his Company (D). There they could see a cloud of dust and smoke some three miles farther north. They assumed it was Custer. As they watched, however, they saw warriors emerging from the smoke, heading toward them, "thick as grasshoppers in a harvest field."

Just then, Benteen arrived with his own Company H, Captain French's Company M and Lieutenant Godfrey's Company K but the rest of the command including Major Reno, the wounded, the horseless and the recently arrived Pack Train were strung out along the bluffs for over a mile, whilst some in the rear never left their positions. Most of Weir's Company D had already begun moving down a small coulee following the trail left by Custer but they soon began galloping back chased by "myriads of howling red devils" Looking at the situation, Benteen realized this was "a hell of a place to fight Indians." He decided they must retreat to their original position, now called the Reno-Benteen defence site as "there was no necessity of having a repetition" of Reno's earlier rout. He ordered French and Godfrey's Companies to form defensive skirmish lines to let Weir's men pass safely through, before retreating themselves. In the meantime, Benteen quickly rode back to Reno, and insisted that the command "fort up" on the bluffs near where he and Reno had met earlier. Here Benteen quickly established a horseshoe-shaped defensive perimeter occupying two small hills, with a shallow depression between them - where the horses and pack mules were corralled. They were attacked immediately and throughout the rest of the day.

As night fell, the attack slackened off, while the large Lakota village in the valley below was alive with celebration. With darkness as cover however officers were able to move around the defensive lines with more freedom. There has been some speculation that during this time, there was a disagreement between Reno and Benteen. It is alleged that the Major proposed that they mount up every fit man and ride for the Powder River camp - presumably along their back trail down the Rosebud - abandoning their position under the cover of darkness and leaving superfluous equipment behind. Benteen wanted to know what Reno wanted to do about the wounded men, many of whom could not ride. Reno is thought to have responded that "we'll have to abandon those who cannot ride". Benteen answered "I won't do it" Whether such an exchange happened as quoted, some of the other officers realised something had occurred. At one point, Captain Tom McDougall of Company B pulled Benteen aside. "Fred", he said quietly "I think you'd better take charge and run the thing"§ Also, Captain Weir of Company D - never a close friend of Benteen - sought out Lieutenant Edward Godfrey of Company K. He asked him "If there should be a conflict of judgement between Reno and Benteen as to what we should do, whose orders would you obey?" "Benteen's" replied Godfrey. §

About 2:30 a.m., two rifle shots signalled a resumption of the attack. Whatever his reluctance earlier, Benteen took charge of the force, leading at least one, perhaps three, charges which drove the Indians back just as it seemed the soldiers would be overrun. Cool and calm (at one point he lay down for a nap), Benteen walked among his troops encouraging them. When his men urged him to get down, he replied that he was protected by some charm his wife had sewn in his uniform. He was wounded in the thumb, and the heel was shot off one of his boots.

Attacks on the soldiers dwindled by the afternoon of June 26. By 4:00 p.m., gunfire had stopped altogether. By 5:00 p.m., thick smoke obscured the village. The smoke cleared by sunset, revealing the entire village moving away "two to three and a half miles long and from half a mile to a mile wide ... as if someone was moving a heavy carpet over the ground." moving south. Overnight, Army stragglers from Reno's battalion, given up for dead, wandered in. Finally, during the morning of June 27, the survivors could see a cloud of dust downriver. It turned out to be Generals Alfred Terry and John Gibbon. The standoff was over.

When General Terry and his staff reached him, Benteen asked if he knew "where Custer had gone." Terry answered, "To the best of my knowledge and belief, he lies on this ridge about four miles below here with all his command killed." Benteen could not believe it. Later they rode to the battlefield, where Benteen identified Custer's body. "By God, he said, "that is him."

In the aftermath of the battle, Benteen's decision to remain with Reno, rather than continuing on at once to seek Custer, was much criticized. One veteran of the battle said decades later:

Reno proved incompetent and Benteen showed his indifference—I will not use the uglier words that have often been in my mind. Both failed Custer and he had to fight it out alone.

— Private William Taylor, M Troop 7th US Cavalry, veteran of Little Bighorn. Letter of 21 February 1910

It is unlikely, however, that a private in a company that had been just fighting for its very survival in the chaotic escape from the Valley would be aware of the overall strategic situation faced by the two battalion commanders on the hilltop in the immediate aftermath of Reno's retreat. How many wounded men were there, how much ammunition was available, and how long would it take for the Pack Train to come up with the reserves of ammunition and other equipment were vital considerations, not forgetting the fact that at that time neither Reno nor Benteen knew exactly where Custer was, as he had neglected to apprise either of them of his plans. Just like other critics, many of whom did not take part in the battle, did Taylor really expect Benteen (and Reno) to abandon wounded troopers and to leave the Pack Train to fend for itself in a countryside swarming with hostile Indians, and to ride pell-mell, low on ammunition, to rescue a larger battalion whose whereabouts were unknown.

Lieutenant Frank Gibson of Company H, however, expressed a more rounded view in his letter to his wife immediately after the battle. "It was impossible as we could neither abandon our wounded men, nor the packs of the command. Any movement in Custer's direction would have to be at a pace allowing the slow moving mules and hand-carried wounded men to keep up."

As for Benteen's actions during the hilltop fight, there is ample praise from people who were actually there rather than from critics who were not. First Sergeant John Ryan, who Benteen had previously disciplined, stated "Too much cannot be said in favour of Captain Benteen. His prompt movements saved Reno from utter annihilation, and his gallantry cleared the ravines of Indians". Lieutenant Varnum: Benteen was really the only officer looking out for the whole command and he handled things well and fought very gallantly. Sergeant Roy: Benteen saved the command...He was a very brave...man" Private Peter Thompson, a Medal of Honour winner, added that "Wherever Benteen went the soldiers faces lighted up with hope"

Charles Windolph was a private in Company H, and was also awarded the Medal of Honour for his role in providing covering fire for the water gathering details organised by Benteen on the second day of the siege. In later years he said of Benteen "After ten years service with Benteen he was just about the finest soldier and the greatest gentleman I ever knew." Windolph was discharged from the cavalry in 1883 having reached the rank of sergeant, but lived until 1950. Before he died at the age of 98 he had become the last living army survivor of the Little Big Horn.

Despite this, Benteen's critics - or more correctly Custer supporters - continued over the years, even up to the present day, to belittle or disparage his decision-making and actions at the Little Big Horn. Custer's wife Elizabeth (Libbie) was particularly fanatical in trying to preserve her husbands "legacy" up to her death in April 1933, but to a certain extent that is understandable. However, Benteen was also subject to speculative criticism from some military figures and others who formed judgements based on what they knew, or thought they knew, about the Custer / Benteen relationship, rather than on the facts of the situation on the ground faced by Benteen (and Reno).

It is correct that Benteen regarded Custer as a braggart, a glory seeker and someone whose reputation was falsely inflated after the Washita Campaign, and that he never forgave him for "abandoning" Major Elliott and his men. But to claim that any "vindictiveness" towards Custer prompted Benteen to deliberately ignore the plight of the two hundred or so other men of Custer's battalion at the Little Big Horn is not credible. Amongst the men with Custer that day were many with whom Benteen had served through thick and thin for ten years or more, some of whom, including Captain Myles Keogh of Company I and Surgeon George E. Lord, were very good and respected friends. Benteen, Keogh and Lord often ate meals together when on manoeuvres and Keogh, who was by no means part of the Custer clique, often reserved a bivouac position for Benteen if he had been last into camp because of rear-guard duties. The reason Benteen did not move towards Custer is because the military situation that he faced on the ground in respect of wounded men, lack of ammunition and the certain abandonment of the Pack Train dictated that he couldn't and shouldn't.

Some commentators have also claimed that despite Benteen taking on overall command of the beleaguered troops on the hillside he was indifferent to the welfare of his own Company H. This claim is based on the fact that the company suffered more casualties than other Companies, particularly on the second morning of the siege, because Benteen had not taken adequate measures to protect them. Again, however, this claim does not stand up to detailed scrutiny. Company H covered a greater length of the defensive perimeter than any other company, and they occupied the most critical and exposed position at the south / southwest corner, on the edge of the high bluffs overlooking the river valley. For a time, a small squad even occupied an outlier knoll some distance in front of the main defence to the south, as this provided for an additional field of fire into the many ravines that were being used by the Indians to work their way close to the defenders. All around the perimeter the defences were never more than makeshift - low breastworks made of hardtack boxes, saddles and even dead horses, improved where possible by shallow rifle pits dug out with spoons, forks, plates, tin cups and bare hands as there were very few proper tools available even in the Pack Train. The ground was baked hard and flintlike in most places but it was particularly bad along the bluff edge occupied by Company H.

The main cause of the casualties suffered by Company H, however, was due to the fact that their position on the defensive line meant that their unprotected backs were exposed to random, long-distance rifle fire from Indians on what became known as Sharpshooter Ridge, an area of high ground to the northeast of the perimeter, with a field of fire across the whole of the defences. That's not to say that some of the other Companies didn't also suffer from the shooting from this direction, but most of them had some form of frontal protection which Company H did not. Of the 14 casualties suffered by Company H (3 killed and 11 wounded) all but 2 were hit from the right and rear, not from the front

Benteen actually recognised this problem and did his best to resolve it. Firstly, on the second morning he gathered his men and led a charge to clear away the Indians closest to his lines. He then ordered some of his men to take up positions in front of their flimsy barricades on what is known as "the military crest" which is a tactical position below a summit offering greater observation and improved field of fire. Provided weapons have sufficient killing range, which for all its other faults, the Springfield "trapdoor" carbine used by the 7th Cavalry did, occupying the military crest means that defenders can keep an enemy at a safe distance. Locating his men here meant that they now had better protection from Indians firing randomly into their rear from Sharpshooter Ridge. Benteen also went to Reno and insisted that he gather some troops on the opposite side of the perimeter for a similar charge to clear out some of the Indians firing from Sharpshooter Ridge, which further helped the situation.

This tactic of using the military crest also gave Benteen an idea about securing much needed water, particularly for the wounded men, by organising small parties of men to descend the ravines to the river, covered by marksmen on the top of the slopes. Over the next few hours, a number of small parties from most Companies made the sortie to the river to fetch water protected by covering fire from Benteen's Company H men. There was one fatality and two or three wounded but overall the tactic proved very successful. and there were a number of Medals of Honour won by the men involved.

As a final word on the Benteen / Custer relationship, on closer examination, the "Custer legacy" or reputation which most of Benteen's critics were trying to preserve has been inflated to a point not borne out by all the facts. Custer performed very badly under General Hancock in Kansas in 1867 and was court-martialled in the aftermath. This was largely forgotten after his strike against Black Kettle at the Washita, but - if not in the eyes of the general public - certainly amongst some of his Officers particularly Benteen, this needed to be weighed against the fact that he made a huge tactical error in not scouting the whole of the valley, and against his abandonment of Major Elliott and his men. At the Washita Custer was lucky, but he thrived for many years in the limelight that it afforded him. He had some skirmishes against the Lakota Sioux along the Yellowstone in 1873, but prior to the Little Big Horn the Washita was his only major encounter with Indians. Nevertheless, he managed a certain mileage from that single event which "sustained his reputation and kept him visible.", which did nothing to improve his relationship with Benteen.

Benteen knew that in terms of experience and success in fighting Indians, Custer's claim comes well short of that of Colonel Nelson Miles and General George Crook, and as a cavalry commander he was nowhere near as good as Colonel Ranald MacKenzie whose 4th Cavalry became a crack unit under his leadership, far superior to Custer's 7th, in both discipline and combat effectiveness. In essence, Custer's claim to fame rested on two engagements, the controversial Washita and the even more controversial Little Big Horn. "While he basked in the former, his death at the latter permanently negated any personal aftereffects" Instead, to keep his reputation intact his supporters looked for scapegoats and poured criticism on others, particularly Benteen and Reno.

After the battle, when Reno, as the most senior 7th Officer who survived the Little Big Horn, produced his official report of the engagement he commended only one officer for exceptional conduct. The one officer was Benteen. Bearing in mind that he and Benteen never really got on, Reno wrote "....if ever a soldier deserved recognition by his Government for distinguished services he certainly does."

Without exception, those other Officers who survived and commented on the battle echoed Reno's endorsement of Benteen. Even the civilian guide George Herendeen said simply "I think Captain Benteen saved the fight on the hill"

In early July, at a camp on the Yellowstone, Benteen began writing a series of letters to his wife. Amongst other things he told her that the 7th Cavalry had already began its reorganisation. With Reno in command, it initially comprised the seven Companies who survived - albeit with reduced numbers due to the casualties suffered - and an eighth made up of the survivors from the other five which had been lost with Custer but which been detached prior to the battle to provide extra protection for the Pack Train. In September in order to help reinstate the other four Companies, Benteen was placed on recruitment assignment and sent east. He was in St. Paul when the depleted 7th Cavalry finally marched back into Fort Lincoln on 26 September.

The winter of 1876-77 was a happy time for Benteen, as he was able to spend most of it with his wife - his darling Frabbie - and his son Freddie. They travelled extensively, including to Chicago, Philadelphia and St Louis. In March 1877, however, he was summoned back to St. Paul to testify as a witness for the defence in a court-martial of Major Reno, who was charged with making indecent advances to towards Emiline, the wife of Lieutenant Bell. Reno was however convicted and sentenced to two years suspension from rank, duty and pay. After the trial, Benteen boarded a train for Bismarck on route to re-joining his Company at Fort Rice.

== Later military activities ==
In March 1877, as Benteen was returning to duty, Fort Rice received a new post commander as Custer's replacement; Lieutenant Colonel Elmer Otis an 1853 West Point graduate who had spent the previous twenty years with the 1st Cavalry. However, the 7ths most senior officer, Colonel Samuel D. Sturgis had also been finally released from detached service postings and had returned to nearby Fort Lincoln to command the regiment in person for the first time since 1872.

Benteen participated in the Nez Perce campaign in 1877. On 2 May 1877, eleven Companies of the 7th Cavalry under the direct command of Colonel Sturgis left Fort Lincoln bound for the Yellowstone River - Company C was left behind to guard the mail route from Bismarck to Deadwood in the Black Hills. The initial purpose of the expedition was to patrol the Yellowstone area to round up any stray bands of hostile Indians and to prevent a larger band of Sioux under Sitting Bull that had escaped to Canada the previous winter after the Little Big Horn from slipping back across the border. The column reached Fort Burford close to the confluence of the Yellowstone and Missouri Rivers without incident on 16 May, and a week later on the 23rd the Cavalry was ferried across the Yellowstone and began patrolling along its north bank. They went into camp near Cedar Creek on 29 May from which regular patrols were sent out. Whilst there Benteen wrote a number of letters to his wife in which he gave his opinion of where the hostile Indians were likely to be found and whether they would fight.

Benteen's view in those letters was right - and wrong. The Sioux, both in Canada and south of the border did not fight, but the Nez Perce Indians, whose homeland was well to the west in Idaho and Oregon had already begun an awesome trek that would take them almost to the Canadian border including two fateful encounters with the 7th Cavalry.

A number of small Nez Perce bands had refused to sign the 1863 treaty establishing a reservation at Fort Lapwai in Washington Territory, preferring to live peaceably instead in their ancestral lands in the Wallowa Valley in Oregon. In 1877, the U.S. Government adopted a get-tough policy and attempted to force the non-treaty Nez Perce onto the reservation. Following a few incidents during which a small number of white settlers were killed by some hot-headed young warriors, the tribal leaders, including Chief Joseph, met and decided to flee the inevitable reprisals, striking out for Montana. Initially they were pursued by General Oliver Howard in whose department of the Columbia the Nez Perce lived, but with little success. By mid August, their incredible progress had brought them into Montana and on 9 August they roundly defeated troops under Colonel John Gibbon at Big Hole, after he had attacked their camp. Army loses were 29 killed and 41 wounded. Whilst the losses were not on the scale of the Little Big Horn the previous year, it was a terrible price to pay for failure, and ironically one of those killed was Lieutenant James Bradley who had been the first to discover Custer's dead at the Little Big Horn.

Immediately after this engagement Colonel Sturgis was ordered to halt his patrolling along the Yellowstone and to ready six Companies of the 7th Cavalry for a move to cut off the Nez Perce, who were by now heading towards the Canadian border. On 12 August Sturgis began to deploy west up the Yellowstone River to Pompey's Pillar, then north towards the Musselshell River and the Judith Gap. Lt. Colonel Otis had previously been invalided back to Fort Rice, so Sturgis divided his force into two battalions - giving Companies F, I and L to Major Merrill and Companies G, H and M to Benteen, as the senior Captain. On September 1, the 7th went into camp about 35 miles north of Clark's Fork Canyon, before marching to high ground around Heart Mountain. Ignoring Benteen's advice on the route the Nez Perce were likely to take, the Indians were able to slip around Sturgis' left flank and gain two days march on the soldiers. Force marching his men over the next few days, Sturgis finally caught up with the Nez Perce at Canyon Creek, a narrow pass surrounded by high cliffs. On the afternoon of 13 September, the two battalions of the 7th engaged the Nez Perce in a running fight, but the Indians had the advantage of high ground and prepared defensive positions, and despite several valiant charges particularly by Benteen's men, the Indians managed to make good their escape yet again.

The Nez Perce were finally cornered by Colonel Nelson Miles and a scratch force that included three other Companies of the 7th Cavalry (A, D and K) at Bear Paw Mountain on 30 September, where they finally surrendered.

Rather belatedly, on February 27, 1890, Benteen was brevetted brigadier general for his actions at the Battle of Canyon Creek, as well as for his earlier actions at the Little Big Horn in 1876.

One of the 7th Cavalry's new lieutenants who joined the regiment at the time of the Nez Perce campaign in 1877 was Hugh L. Scott, who served in the regiment for 20 years until 1897. Years later as a retired chief of staff of the U.S. Army, Scott wrote this of Benteen:

" I found my model early in Captain Benteen, the idol of the Seventh Cavalry on the upper Missouri in 1877, who governed mainly by suggestion; in all the years I knew him I never once heard him raise his voice to enforce his purpose....I watched his every movement to find out the secret of his quiet steady government, that I might go and govern likewise....If he found that his kindly manner were misunderstood, then his iron hand would close down quickly, but that was seldom necessary, and then only with newcomers and never twice with the same person. Benteen's policy which I adopted in 1877 has paid me large dividends"

In 1879 Benteen testified at the court of inquiry in Chicago which was set up specifically to investigate the actions of Major Reno at the Little Big Horn in 1876. Benteen was careful not to say anything derogatory about Reno, particularly the alleged proposal by the major to abandon the wounded in a possible escape attempt by the command from the hilltop on the night of 25–26 June. Intended as a fact-finding forum, the inquiry degenerated into a public trial of Reno, and it inevitably wound down with a rather faint-hearted conclusion. "The conduct of the officers throughout (the battle) was excellent" the board decided, "and while subordinates (Benteen in particular)....did more for the safety of the command by brilliant displays of courage than did Major Reno there was nothing in his conduct which requires animadversion from this Court". Benteen's only regret about his testimony at the inquiry was that he "was not allowed to turn loose on Custer"

Later that year, Reno who was a heavy drinker, was court-martialled twice; the first time in September for conduct unbecoming an officer and a gentlemen after a brawl at the Post Traders in Fort Meade, the second time in November for making unseemly advances towards Colonel Sturgis' 21 year old daughter Ella, whilst he was confined in post under open arrest following the first court-martial. Reno was sentenced to be dismissed from the army, and despite General Sherman recommending modification to one year's suspension, confinement to post and a demotion of "five files in the list of Majors of Cavalry", President Hayes confirmed the dismissal in March 1880. During his last days at Fort Meade, Reno was ostracised by officers of the 7th, and although he and Reno had never got on the exception was Fred Benteen.

At this point Benteen had been the senior Captain in the 7th for nearly 5 years, but following the Army's strict promotion protocols, Reno's position as Major went to Captain Edward Ball of the 2nd Cavalry.

Benteen spent the remainder of 1880 and the first part of 1881, patrolling out of Fort Meade. After a period of leave over the summer months, he was placed on detached service in October 1881 to the Springfield Arsenal in Massachusetts testing repeating rifles and carbines for possible Army adoption. Finally in January 1883, as he was by now the most senior Captain in the whole of the Cavalry services, he was notified of his promotion to Major, effective 17 December 1882, and his appointment to the 9th U.S. Cavalry - a Black regiment. This was somewhat ironic as in later years Benteen claimed that after the Civil War in 1866 he had been offered the position of Major in the 10th Cavalry - the other Black cavalry regiment of the U.S. Army - but had declined, preferring a captaincy in the 7th Cavalry. There is however no official evidence of the 1866 offer.

When Benteen joined his new regiment, it was based at Fort Riley in Kansas, under Colonel Edward Hatch, whom Benteen had known by reputation since the Civil War, and initially the two men got on well. As well as providing security for Indian Agents and keeping a eye on the mainly benevolent Cheyenne, Kiowa and Comanche on the reservations, the 9th Cavalry were employed trying to keep white settlers out of what was then Indian Territory. While Hatch himself led no less than three expeditions from Fort Riley in the summer of 1883 chasing white intruders, styled "Boomers", Benteen remained behind in command of the post. In early September 1883, Benteen fell and injured his back and was laid up for a week before returning to duty. This was the start of an increasing number of physical ailments that Benteen suffered in his latter years of service, no doubt exacerbated by the fact that by then he had spent the best part of 25 years in the saddle on active duty. However, his spirits were lifted in October when he was joined at Fort Riley by his wife.

In the spring of 1884 with white "Boomers" still making incursions, Benteen was assigned to command the post at Fort Sill, garrisoned by two troops (formerly companies, the named having been recently changed only in cavalry regiments) of the 9th Cavalry and four Companies of the 24th Infantry, also a coloured regiment. Benteen was involved in a number of forays against the "Boomers", throughout 1884 and into 1885, but he was convinced that just as previously in the Black Hills, it was only a matter of time before the Government relented under pressure from the settlers.

In June 1885, the 9th Cavalry was redeployed to Wyoming. After a short train journey from Fort Sill to Fort Riley, Benteen marched the 2nd Squadron comprising Troops B, D, E, H, and L northward to Fort McKinney arriving on 1 August, where the Squadron garrisoned the post along with two Companies from the 9th and 21st Infantry Regiments. By this time, there was some increasing friction in Benteen's relationship with Colonel Hatch and, because he was also increasingly suffering from chronic ailments, Benteen began to seriously consider retirement. He had reached the rank of Major, albeit the junior in the 9th, and he had passed the twenty year service milestone.

Benteen was granted some detached service to attend the tenth anniversary of the Little Big Horn in June 1886, and on his return to to Fort McKinney, he became the second ranking Major of the 9th Cavalry, due to the death of Thomas DeWees. However, he was soon to lose the amenities of the established post, as he received orders to relocate with two Troops (B & E) to Fort DuChesne in Utah Territory, because the Ute Indians on the Uintah Reservation east of Salt Lake City were becoming restless. After a long and uncomfortable journey made by partly by train, Benteen formally assumed command of the cluster of tents that comprised the yet unbuilt Fort DuChesne. His first priority was to calm potential Indian unrest, which he did in a matter of days by assigning an infantry detachment to guard the Agency H.Q. He then turned his attention to building the post, which became a fiasco. Much-needed supplies and equipment were constantly delayed or did not arrive at all due to Army procurement incompetence, and the troops had to remain in tents well into the winter.

Always fond of a drink, the pressures of building and managing an isolated post without adequate support and suffering from a number of chronic health problems, meant that Benteen increasingly hit the bottle. It all came to a head in February 1887 when, after a number of incidents, he was suspended from duty for alleged drunk and disorderly conduct at Fort Duchesne, Utah. He was convicted by Court Martial and could have faced dismissal from the Army. The Divisional Commander, General George Crook, endorsed the Court Martial findings and forwarded them up the chain of command but with a recommendation that if clemency was to be extended, Benteen should at least "receive some discipline....for his unsoldierlike conduct". In early April General Sheridan endorsed the findings, but recommended "remission of sentence for reasons given in the record of his services". On 20 April 1887, President Grover Cleveland reduced his sentence to a one-year suspension from rank and duty at half pay "in view of his long and honourable service and the reputation he has earned for bravery and soldierly qualities".

Benteen spent his year on half pay at home in Atlanta during which time he was able to put his financial affairs in good order. Returning to duty with the 9th Cavalry in April 1888, he was posted to Fort Niobrara, four miles east of Valentine, Nebraska. However, his overall health had not improved in his year off-duty and he applied almost immediately to appear before a Medical Retiring Board at Fort Leavenworth where he underwent examinations beginning on 10 June. The board reported on 27 June, and found that Major Frederick W. Benteen was "incapacitated for active service because of defective vision, frequent micturation caused by either spinal lesion or inflammation of the prostrate gland, and neuralgia; all of which are incident to the service"

Benteen officially retired from the Army on July 7, 1888.

In 1927, Edward Godfrey, who commanded Company K as part of Benteen's Battalion at the Little Big Horn, told his godfather Frank Anders:

Benteen...was the finest type of accomplished cavalry officer that the United States army ever had. He specifically did not except (sic) Custer. He said to me "I was never a Custerite" He said that Benteen was utterly reliable, trustworthy, had a keen sense of humour, a very fine natural sense of distances, areas, number of men in formations....and that he was especially fine in strategy and tactics....He was especially good at the judging of the capability of man or beast on a campaign, and that he was especially good in the conservation of the troops under his command...and that he differed in every way (to Custer) as to administration, training, care of men and horses, tactics strategy and campaigning.

== Family ==
While stationed in eastern Missouri in 1856, Benteen became acquainted with Catharine "Kate" Louisa Norman, a young woman recently arrived in St. Louis from Philadelphia. They were married on January 7, 1862, at St. George's Church in St. Louis. He and Catherine had five children, four of whom died in infancy: Caroline Elizabeth, born in July 1863 at St. Louis; died before her first birthday; Katherine Norman, born in December 1868 at Fort Harker, Kansas; died a year later; Francis "Fannie" Gibson Norman, born in April 1872 at Nashville, Tennessee; died at eight months; Theodore Norman, born April 1875 at Fort Rice, North Dakota; died that winter. Their fourth child, Frederick Wilson, born March 27, 1873, at Atlanta, Georgia, survived, living until July 20, 1956. Like his father, he pursued a military career, rising to Lt. Colonel.

== Death and legacy ==
Benteen died in Atlanta, Georgia, on June 22, 1898, leaving his widow Kate and son Frederick. He was buried in Westview Cemetery in Atlanta; his pallbearers included Georgia Governor William Y. Atkinson and Atlanta mayor Charles A. Collier. Benteen's remains were later re-interred at Arlington National Cemetery.

Benteen Elementary School in Atlanta, Georgia is named for Frederick Benteen's son, Frederick Wilson Benteen, who grew up there and had a military career.
