= Clara Blinn =

American settler (1847–1868)

- Born: 1847
- Died: 1868 (aged 20–21)

Clara Blinn (1847–1868) was an American settler who, with her two-year-old son Willie, was captured by Native Americans in October 1868 in Colorado Territory during an attack on the wagon train in which she and her family were traveling. She and her little boy were killed on or about November 27, 1868, during or in the immediate aftermath of the Battle of Washita River, in which the camp of the Cheyenne chief Black Kettle was attacked and destroyed by troops of the Seventh U.S. Cavalry under the command of Lt. Col. George Armstrong Custer. Clara and Willie Blinn's bodies were found some two weeks after the fight in one of several abandoned Indian camps along the Washita River near present-day Cheyenne, Oklahoma.

Clara and Willie Blinn remain at the center of a historical controversy over the exact circumstances of their death, the identity of their captors, and the location of their bodies when they were found. Contemporary sources disagree over whether the Blinns were held captive by Kiowas, Cheyennes, or Arapahos and, if by Cheyennes, whether they were held in Black Kettle's camp or in one of the other Cheyenne villages encamped along the Washita River at the time of the attack. Present-day authorities on the Battle of the Washita continue to reflect differing opinions on these questions.

== Early life and marriage ==
Clara Isabel Harrington was born in Elmore, Ohio on October 21, 1847. Daughter of William T. and Harriet Bosley Harrington, who later became proprietors of the Baird House Hotel in Perrysburg, Ohio. She was described by her family as a "tiny, beautiful girl with dark hair, freckles sprinkled across her nose, a dimple in her chin, and an inveterate joker who exuded exuberance and a joy for living."

On August 12, 1865 she married Richard Foote Blinn of Perrysburg. Richard had fought in the American Civil War in the 31st Ohio Cavalry, receiving an early discharge after suffering a wound to his arm from which he never fully recovered. Despite the wound, he later enlisted and served in a "hundred days" volunteer unit. The Blinns were members of the Perrysburg Methodist Episcopal Church. Clara gave birth to a son, William, known as "Willie," in 1866.

== Colorado Territory ==
In spring of 1868, the Harringtons departed Perrysburg to go west, settling in Ottawa, Franklin County, Kansas. Richard and Clara Blinn, with Willie traveled further west, all the way to Colorado Territory. After a few months in Colorado they wrote to Clara's maternal aunt Myra Mottram of their intent to surprise Clara's parents by relocating to Kansas to be nearer to them. However, Clara's aunt evidently told the Harringtons, who waited, futilely, for the arrival of their daughter and her family.

Richard joined in a partnership with his brother-in-law, John F. Buttles, to deliver supplies to government outposts. The pair organized a wagon train of eight wagons, one hundred cattle, ten men (including Richard), and Clara and Willie, departing Bogg's Ranch in Colorado Territory on October 5 or 6, 1868, bound eastward towards Fort Dodge, Kansas along the Arkansas River on the Santa Fe Trail. They had plans to stop off in Ottawa with the Harringtons. Clara and Willie rode in the supply wagon, with Clara carrying on her person money belonging to John Buttles and her husband's brother Hubble Blinn, including a bag of gold coins and a bundle of nearly $800 in bills.

== Capture ==
On October 7, along the Arkansas River about ten miles (16 km) east of the mouth of Sand Creek, the wagon train was attacked by a force of about 75 Indians. One man was wounded during the attack, and the Indians succeeded in stampeding the ox teams, acquiring four of the wagons and taking Mrs. Blinn and her child captive. The remaining wagons were set afire with flaming arrows. Throughout the day and into the night the Indians kept up their attack on the remainder of the train, during which time the Indian party increased to about 200 warriors. On the following day, October 8, most of the Indians withdrew across the Arkansas to camp on its south bank, but returned that night to renew the attack. They attacked again on October 9, besieging the men for four more days before withdrawing again across the Arkansas River to ride off to the southeast.

On October 12, one of the men got away and went to Fort Lyon to seek help. Captain William Penrose sent out ten men under Lt. Henry H. Abell to relieve the men still with the wagon train and to search for Mrs. Blinn and her son. About four miles (6.4 km) from where the wagon train had been held under attack, the soldiers found a note Clara had written on a card and laid on a bush along the trail. The note read, "Dear Dick, Willie and I are prisoners. They are going to keep us. If you live, save us if you can. We are with them. [signed] Clara Blinn."

Mr. Owen, the leader of the train, identified Satanta, a prominent Kiowa warrior, as having been among the raiders. According to other sources, the Indians were believed to be mostly Cheyenne or Arapaho.
