= 10th Missouri Cavalry Regiment =

- Active: October 1862 to June 20, 1865
- Country: United States
- Allegiance: Union
- Branch: Cavalry
- Engagements: Battle of Little Blue River; Battle of Byram's Ford; Battle of Westport; Battle of Marais des Cygnes; Battle of Marmiton River; Battle of Mine Creek; Battle of Egypt Station

The 10th Missouri Cavalry Regiment was a cavalry regiment that served in the Union Army during the American Civil War.

== Service ==
The 10th Missouri Cavalry Regiment was organized at Jefferson Barracks in St. Louis, Missouri, in October 1862 and mustered in for three years. It was organized from the 28th Missouri Infantry. Additionally, Bowen's Battalion was assigned as Companies A, B, C, and D, and six companies were organized for the 9th Missouri Cavalry and assigned December 17, 1862, as Companies E, F, G, and H.

The regiment was attached to District of St. Louis, Missouri, to January 1863. District of Memphis, Tennessee, XVI Corps, Department of the Tennessee, to March 1863. Cavalry Brigade, District of Corinth, XVI Corps, to June 1863. 3rd Brigade, 1st Cavalry Division, XVI Corps, to August 1863. Cavalry Brigade, XV Corps, to December 1863. Winslow's Cavalry Brigade, XVI Corps, and District of Vicksburg to April 1864. 2nd Brigade, 1st Cavalry Division, XVI Corps, to June 1864. 2nd Brigade, Cavalry Division, Sturgis' Expedition, June 1864. 2nd Brigade, 1st Cavalry Division, District of West Tennessee, to November 1864. 1st Brigade, 4th Division, Cavalry Corps, Military Division Mississippi, to December 1864. 2nd Brigade, Cavalry Division, District of West Tennessee, to February 1865. 1st Brigade, 4th Division, Cavalry Corps, Military Division Mississippi, to May 1865. 2nd Brigade, 4th Division, Cavalry Corps, Military Division Mississippi, to June 1865.

The 10th Missouri Cavalry mustered out of service on June 20, 1865.

== Detailed service ==
Moved to Memphis, Tenn., December 1862. Duty in the District of Memphis, Tenn., until February 1863. Moved to Corinth, Miss., February 7–15. Actions at Glendale and Tuscumbia, Ala., February 22. Duty in that district until June. Courtney's Plantation April 11. Burnsville, Ala., and Glendale, Miss., April 14. Dodge's Expedition into northern Alabama April 15-May 8. Barton Station April 16–17. Dickson Station, Great Bear Creek, Cherokee Station, and Lundy's Lane April 17. Dickson's Station April 19. Rock Cut near Tuscumbia April 22. Dickson's Station and Tuscumbia April 23. Leighton April 23. Lundy's Lane April 25. Town Creek April 27. Expedition from Burnesville to Tupelo, Miss., May 2–8. Guntown May 4. Tupelo May 5. Near Vicksburg, Miss., May 18 (Company C). Expedition from Corinth to Florence, Ala., May 26–31. Florence, Ala., May 28. Hamburg Landing, Tenn., May 29–30. Iuka, Miss., July 7. Jackson, Miss., July 29. Jacinto August 13. Expedition from Corinth to Henderson, Tenn., September 11–16. Clark's Creek Church September 13 (detachment). Yazoo City, Miss., September 27. Expedition from Big Black River to Yazoo City September 27-October 1 (detachment). Brownsville September 28. Canton September 28. Moore's Ford near Benton September 29. Messenger's Ford October 5. Expedition to Canton October 14–22. Brownsville October 15. Canton Road near Brownsville October 15–16. Treadwell's Plantation near Clinton and Vernon Cross Roads October 16. Bogue Chitto Creek October 17. Robinson's Mill near Livingston October 17. Livingston Road near Clinton October 18. Treadwell's Plantation October 20. Brownsville October 22. Near Yazoo City October 31. Operations about Natchez, Miss., December 1–10. Natchez December 10 (detachment). Meridian Campaign February 3-March 2, 1864. Near Bolton's Depot and Champion Hill February 4. Jackson February 5. Morton and Brandon February 7. Morton February 8. Meridian February 9–13. Hillsboro February 10. Meridian February 13–14. Laudersdale Springs February 16. Union February 21–22. Canton February 24. Near Canton February 26. Sharon February 27. Canton February 29. Livingston March 27. Near Mechanicsburg April 20. Ordered to Memphis, Tenn., April 29. Bolivar, Tenn., May 2. Sturgis' Expedition to Guntown, Miss., June 1–13. Rienzi, Miss., June 6. Danville, Miss., June 6. Brice's or Tishamingo Creek near Guntown June 10. Guntown June 24. Smith's Expedition to Tupelo, July 5–21. Tupelo July 14–15. Old Town Creek July 15. Smith's Expedition to Oxford, Miss., August 1–30. Tallahatchie River August 7–9. Hurricane Creek and Oxford August 9. Tallahatchie River August 10. Oxford August 12. Hurricane Creek August 13–14 and 19. Holly Springs August 27–28. Moved to Little Rock September 2–9. Campaign against Price in Arkansas and Missouri September 17-November 30. Actions at Little Blue October 21. Big Blue and State Line October 22. Westport October 23. Engagement at the Marmiton October 25. Osage, Mine Creek, Marias Des Cygnes, October 25. Rolla November 1. Expedition from Memphis to Moscow November 9–13. A detachment on Grierson's Raid on Mobile & Ohio Railroad December 21, 1864, to January 5, 1865. Verona December 25. Egypt Station December 28, 1864. Regiment at Louisville, Ky., until February 1865. Moved to Gravelly Springs, Ala., February 5–15, 1865. Wilson's Raid from Chickasaw, Ala., to Macon, Ga., March 22-April 24. Near Montevallo, Ala., March 31. Ebenezer Church near Maplesville April 1. Selma April 2. Columbia, Ga., April 16. Capture of Macon, Ga., April 20. Duty at Macon and in Georgia until June. (Company C in demonstration on Haines' Blur April 29-May 2, 1863. Siege of Vicksburg May 18-July 4. Advance on Jackson, Miss., July 5–10. Siege of Jackson July 10–17. Jackson July 29. Expedition to Yazoo City September 27-October 1.)

== Casualties ==
The regiment lost a total of 352 men during service; 2 officers and 52 enlisted men killed or mortally wounded, 3 officers and 295 enlisted men died of disease.

== Commanders ==
- Colonel Florence M. Cornyn
- Lieutenant Colonel Frederick W. Benteen
- Major William H. Lusk - commanded at the Battle of Mine Creek

== See also ==
- Missouri Civil War Union units
- Missouri in the Civil War
