= Battle of the Washita River =

U.S. Cavalry attack on Plains Indian camp

- Part of the Indian Wars
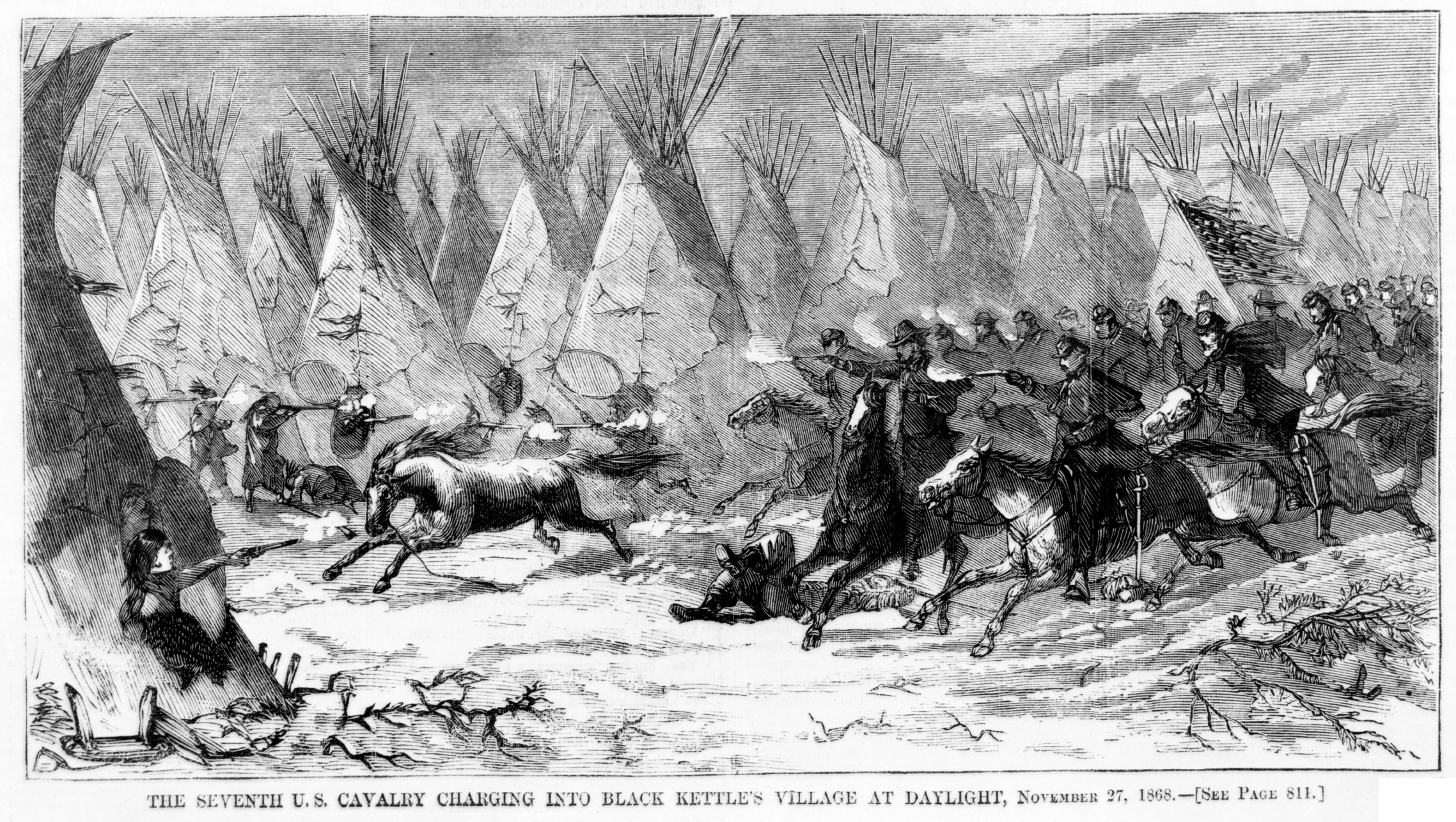
- Battle of Washita from Harper's Weekly, December 19, 1868
Date	November 27, 1868
Location	Roger Mills County, Oklahoma 35°36′59.8″N 99°41′11.6″W
Result	See Controversies

Belligerents
United States	Cheyenne

Commanders and leaders
George Custer; Joel Elliott †	Black Kettle †

Strength
around 700 to 800 soldiers	150 warriors (est.); total camp population 250 (est.)

Casualties and losses
21 killed and 13 wounded	Range of military and civilian scout estimates: * 16 to 140+ men killed * "some" to 75 women and children killed Range of Cheyenne estimates: * 11 to 18 men killed * 17 to "many" women and children killed Total: *Estimates range from 13 to 150 total killed; 53 women and children captured See discussion below for further information and sources.
- Location within Oklahoma

The Battle of the Washita River (also called Battle of the Washita or the Washita Massacre) occurred on November 27, 1868, when Lt. Col. George Armstrong Custer's 7th U.S. Cavalry attacked Black Kettle's Southern Cheyenne camp on the Washita River (the present-day Washita Battlefield National Historic Site near Cheyenne, Oklahoma).

The Cheyenne camp was the most isolated band of a major winter encampment along the river of numerous Native American tribal bands, totaling thousands of people. Custer's forces attacked the village because scouts had found it by tracking the trail of an Indian party that had raided white settlers. Black Kettle and his people had been at peace and were seeking peace. Custer's soldiers killed women and children in addition to warriors, although they also took many captives to serve as hostages and human shields. The number of Cheyenne killed in the attack has been disputed since the first reports.

== Background ==
After the Southern Cheyenne and Arapaho signed the Medicine Lodge Treaty, they were – according to the final treaty text as affirmed by Congress – required to move south from present-day Kansas and Colorado to a new reservation in Indian Territory (modern Oklahoma). The actual oral accord of the treaty negotiations, however, had guaranteed the Cheyenne their traditional hunting lands as long as there was sufficient buffalo to justify the chase, a crucial treaty stipulation that was tacitly dropped in the subsequent ratification process. This forced the Cheyenne to give up their traditional territory for one with little arable land away from buffalo, their main source of meat.

Months of fragile peace survived raids between warring Kaw Indians and Southern Cheyennes, but in summer 1868, war parties of Southern Cheyenne and allied Arapaho, Kiowa, Comanche, Northern Cheyenne, Brulé and Oglala warriors attacked white settlements in western Kansas, southeast Colorado, and northwest Texas. Among these raids were those along the Solomon and Saline rivers in Kansas, which began August 10, 1868. The warriors killed at least 15 white settlers, wounded others, and were reported to have raped some women, as well as taking others captive to be adopted into their tribes.

In 1897, Kansas Rep. Horace L. Moore remarked at a meeting of the Kansas State Historical Society that "The total of losses from September 12, 1868, to February 9, 1869, exclusive of casualties incident to military operations, was 158 men murdered, sixteen wounded and forty-one scalped. Three scouts were killed, fourteen women outraged, one man was captured, four women and twenty-four children were carried off. Nearly all of these losses occurred in what we then called western Kansas, although the Saline, Solomon and Republican do not seem so very far west now".

On August 19, 1868, Colonel Edward W. Wynkoop, Indian Agent for the Cheyenne and Arapaho at Fort Larned, Kansas, interviewed Little Rock, a chief in Black Kettle's Cheyenne village. Little Rock told what he had learned about the raids along the Saline and Solomon rivers. According to Little Rock's account, a war party of about 200 Cheyenne from a camp above the forks of Walnut Creek departed camp intending to go out against the Pawnee. Instead, they raided white settlements along the Saline and Solomon rivers. Some of the warriors returned to Black Kettle's camp. Little Rock learned from them what took place. Little Rock identified the warriors most responsible for the raids and agreed to try to have them delivered to white authorities.

== Native Americans in November 1868 ==
=== Winter camps on the Washita River ===
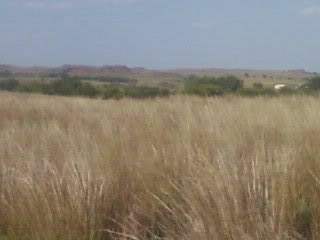
Location of Black Kettle's campsite by the Washita River in 2008

By early November 1868, Black Kettle's camp joined other Southern Cheyenne and other tribal bands at the Washita River, which they called Lodgepole River, after local pine trees. Black Kettle's village was the westernmost of a series of winter camps, of Cheyenne, Arapaho, Kiowa, Comanche, and Kiowa-Apache bands, that ran ten to 15 miles along the Washita River.

Black Kettle's village was several miles west of the rest of the camps and consisted of around 50 Cheyenne lodges, plus one or two lodges of visiting Arapaho and two of visiting Lakota, for a total of about 250 inhabitants. Little Rock, the only council chief who had remained with Black Kettle since the Sand Creek Massacre in 1864, lived with his family in the village. It also included the families of Big Man, Wolf Looking Back, Clown, Cranky Man, Scabby Man, Half Leg, Bear Tongue, and Roll Down.

Downriver from Black Kettle's camp, the Washita River looped northward in a large oxbow. At its northern portion was the Arapaho camp of Little Raven, Big Mouth, Yellow Bear, and Spotted Wolf, a total of about 180 lodges. At the bottom of the loop was a large Southern Cheyenne camp under Medicine Arrows. Followers of Little Robe, Sand Hill, Stone Calf, Old Little Wolf (Big Jake), and Black White Man made up one large village, and nearby was a smaller Cheyenne village consisting of the followers of Old Whirlwind. These two Cheyenne villages, together comprising about 129 lodges, were situated along the oxbow southeast of Little Raven's Arapaho camp and west of a small Kiowa camp headed by Kicking Bird.

The Kiowa leaders Satanta, Lone Wolf, and Black Eagle had moved their villages to the Fort Cobb area. Downriver were other camps of Comanche and Kiowa-Apache. Overall, a total of about 6,000 Native Americans were in winter camp along the upper Washita River.

=== November 20 meeting at Fort Cobb ===
In mid-November, a party headed by Black Kettle and Little Robe of the Cheyenne, and Big Mouth and Spotted Wolf of the Arapaho, arrived at Fort Cobb to visit the post trader, William "Dutch Bill" Griffenstein. Griffenstein's wife Cheyenne Jennie, a Cheyenne originally of Black Kettle's camp, had died around October 10. Griffenstein had sent runners to inform her parents of her death, perhaps also sending a message to urge Black Kettle to come to talk with Colonel (Brevet Major General) William B. Hazen about making peace. The four chiefs met with Hazen on November 20, with Captain Henry Alvord of the Tenth Cavalry documenting the conversations.

Black Kettle began by saying to Hazen, "The Cheyennes, when south of the Arkansas, do not wish to return to the north side because they feared trouble there, but were continually told that they had better go there, as they would be rewarded for so doing." Hardoff notes that by the terms of the Medicine Lodge Treaty, the Cheyenne-Arapaho reservation had the Arkansas River as its northern boundary. In April 1868, the U.S. Army distributed food provisions due the Cheyenne and Arapaho at Fort Larned and Fort Dodge, both north of the Arkansas. On August 9, 1868, they had distributed treaty annuities in the form of arms and ammunition at Fort Larned rather than south of the Arkansas.

Black Kettle continued, asking if he might move his people south to Fort Cobb:

The Cheyennes do not fight at all this side of the Arkansas; they do not trouble Texas, but north of the Arkansas they are almost always at war. When lately north of the Arkansas, some young Cheyennes were fired upon and then the fight began. I have always done my best to keep my young men quiet, but some will not listen, and since the fighting began I have not been able to keep them all at home. But we all want peace, and I would be glad to move all my people down this way; I could then keep them all quietly near camp. My camp is now on the Washita, 40 miles east of the Antelope Hills, and I have there about 180 lodges. I speak only for my own people; I cannot speak nor control the Cheyenne north of the Arkansas.

Big Mouth of the Arapaho spoke next, saying in part:

I never would have gone north of the Arkansas again, but my father there [the agent] sent for me time after time, saying it was the place for my people, and finally I went. No sooner had we got there than there was trouble. I do not want war, and my people do not, but although we have come back south of the Arkansas, the soldiers follow us and continue fighting, and we want you to send out and stop these soldiers from coming against us.

Hazen's October 13 orders from General William Tecumseh Sherman, commander of the Military Division of the Missouri, had charged Hazen with making provision for Native Americans who wanted to stay out of the war. The orders stated if General Philip Sheridan had to invade the reservation to pursue hostile Native Americans, he needed to spare the "well-disposed". Sherman recommended that non-belligerent Native Americans camp near Fort Cobb. Hazen knew that Sheridan had already declared the Cheyenne and Arapaho to be "hostile", meaning they were subject to attack by the U.S. Army. Hazen told the four chiefs he could not make peace with them. He recommended against their coming to Fort Cobb, as their presence would jeopardize the peace of the Kiowa and Comanche already camped there. He told them,

I am sent here as a peace chief; all here is to be peace, but north of the Arkansas is General Sheridan, the great war chief, and I do not control him; and he has all the soldiers who are fighting the Arapahoes and Cheyennes. Therefore, you must go back to your country, and if the soldiers come to fight, you must remember they are not from me, but from that great war chief, and with him you must make peace.

Reporting to Sherman on November 22, Hazen said, "[T]o have made peace with them would have brought to my camp most of those now on the war path south of the Arkansas; and as General Sheridan is to punish those at war and might follow them in afterwards, a second Chivington affair might occur, which I could not prevent." Hazen reported that while the chiefs seemed sincere, the Kiowa and Comanche at Fort Cobb said the young warriors who accompanied the chiefs were pleased that peace had not been made. They boasted that the Lakota and other northern bands would come down the following spring to "clean out the entire country." Hazen took the young warriors' boasts so seriously that he requested two more companies of the 10th Cavalry from Fort Arbuckle and two howitzers to remain for a week or two at Fort Cobb.

=== Black Kettle's return to the Washita ===
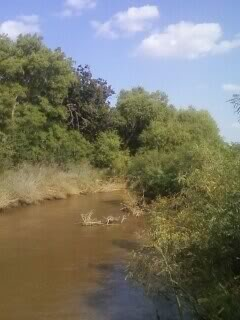
Washita River; vicinity where Chief Black Kettle was killed while trying to cross river

Black Kettle and the other chiefs departed Fort Cobb on about November 21 with food supplied by Griffenstein, traveling through storm conditions. They reached their villages on the Washita on the evening of November 26.

The evening before, on November 25, a war party of as many as 150 warriors, which included young men of the camps of Black Kettle, Medicine Arrows, Little Robe, and Old Whirlwind, had returned to the Washita encampments. They had raided white settlements in the Smoky Hill River country with the Dog Soldiers.

Major Joel Elliott of the Seventh Cavalry found the trail of the raiders on November 26, which drew Custer and his forces to the Washita. On November 26, the same day that Black Kettle returned to the Washita, a party of Kiowa returning from raiding the Utes passed through Black Kettle's camp on their way to their own village. They told the Cheyenne that as they had passed near the Antelope Hills on the Canadian River, they had seen a large trail leading southward toward the Washita camps. The Cheyenne discounted the information, as they did not believe U.S. soldiers would operate so far south in such wintry conditions. The Kiowa proceeded to their own village further east along the river, but Trails the Enemy decided to stay overnight with friends in Black Kettle's camp.

Also on November 26, Crow Neck, a returning warrior, told Bad Man (also known as Cranky Man) that he had left an exhausted horse along the trail to rest. When he went back to retrieve the horse that day, he saw moving figures to the north who looked like soldiers. Fearful, he turned back without getting his horse. Bad Man doubted Crow Neck had seen soldiers; he said perhaps he had a guilty conscience from having gone against the chiefs' wishes by joining the war party. Crow Neck told no one else what he had seen, fearing that he might be laughed at, or chastised by Black Kettle for having been part of the raid.

On the evening of November 26, Black Kettle held a council in his lodge with the principal men of his village to convey what he had learned at Fort Cobb about Sheridan's war plans. Discussion lasted into the early morning hours of November 27. The council decided that after the foot-deep snow cleared, they would send out runners to talk with the soldiers. They wanted to clear up misunderstandings and make it clear that Black Kettle's people wanted peace. Meanwhile, they decided to move camp the next day downriver to be closer to the other Indian camps.

According to Moving Behind Woman, who was about 14 at the time of the attack at the Washita camp, Black Kettle's wife Medicine Woman stood outside the lodge for a long time. She was angry that the camp was not moving that night, saying, "I don't like this delay, we could have moved long ago. The Agent sent word for us to leave at once. It seems we are crazy and deaf, and cannot hear." Black Hawk's brother White Shield (also known as Gentle Horse) had a vision of a wolf wounded on the right side of its head mourning its little ones, which had been scattered and killed by a powerful enemy. He tried to persuade Black Kettle to move camp immediately, but was unsuccessful. But five of Black Kettle's children (four daughters and a son) moved to the camp of Black Kettle's nephew Whirlwind, which was ten miles downriver (five miles straight-line distance).

== Sheridan's offensive ==
General Philip Sheridan, in command of the U.S. Army's Department of the Missouri, decided upon a winter campaign against the Cheyenne. While difficult, a winter campaign offered chances for decisive results, since it was the only time of year the Plains Indians were immobilized. If their shelter, food, and livestock could be destroyed or captured, not only the warriors but their women and children would be at the mercy of both the Army and the elements. They would be forced to surrender. Sheridan planned to have three columns converge on the Indian wintering grounds just east of the Texas Panhandle: one from Fort Lyon in Colorado, one from Fort Bascom in New Mexico, and one from a supply camp to be established (Camp Supply). There, Lt. Col. George A. Custer commanded the 7th Cavalry's 800 soldiers against the various bands on the Washita River. They set out on November 23, 1868, in the midst of heavy snow, and headed south.

== Custer's attack ==
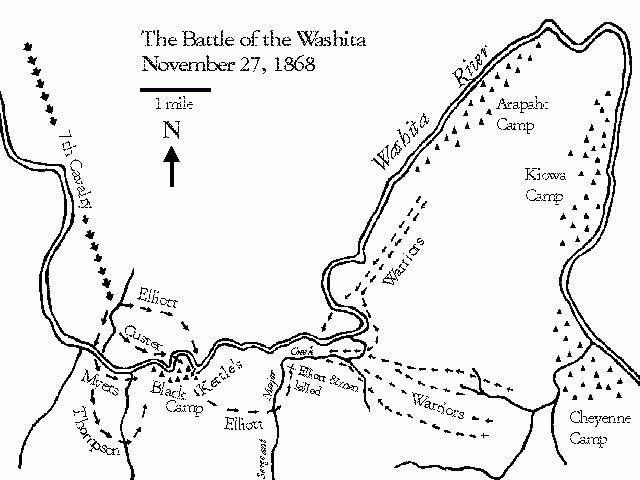
Map of the battle

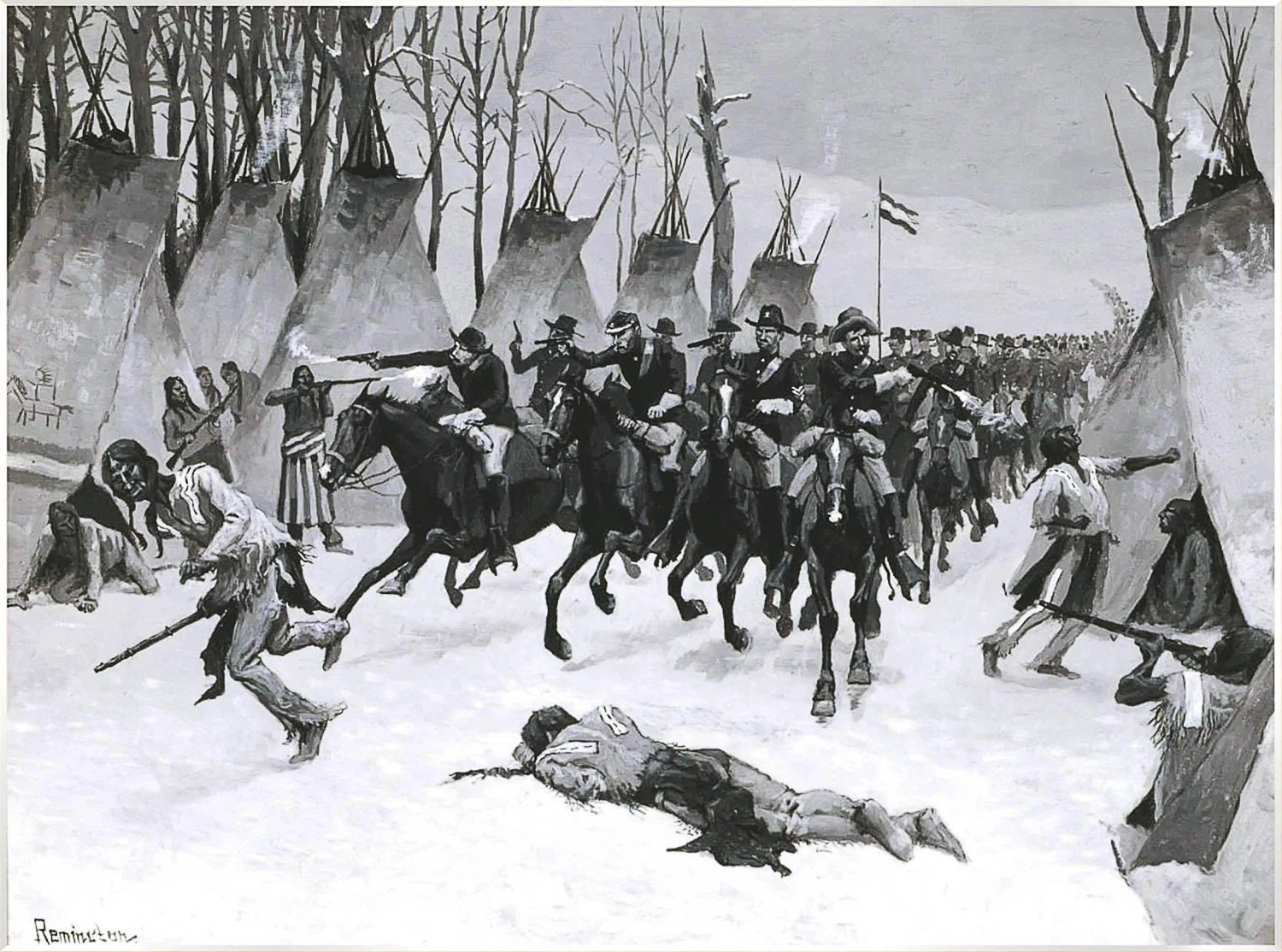
Battle of Washita painting by Frederic Remington

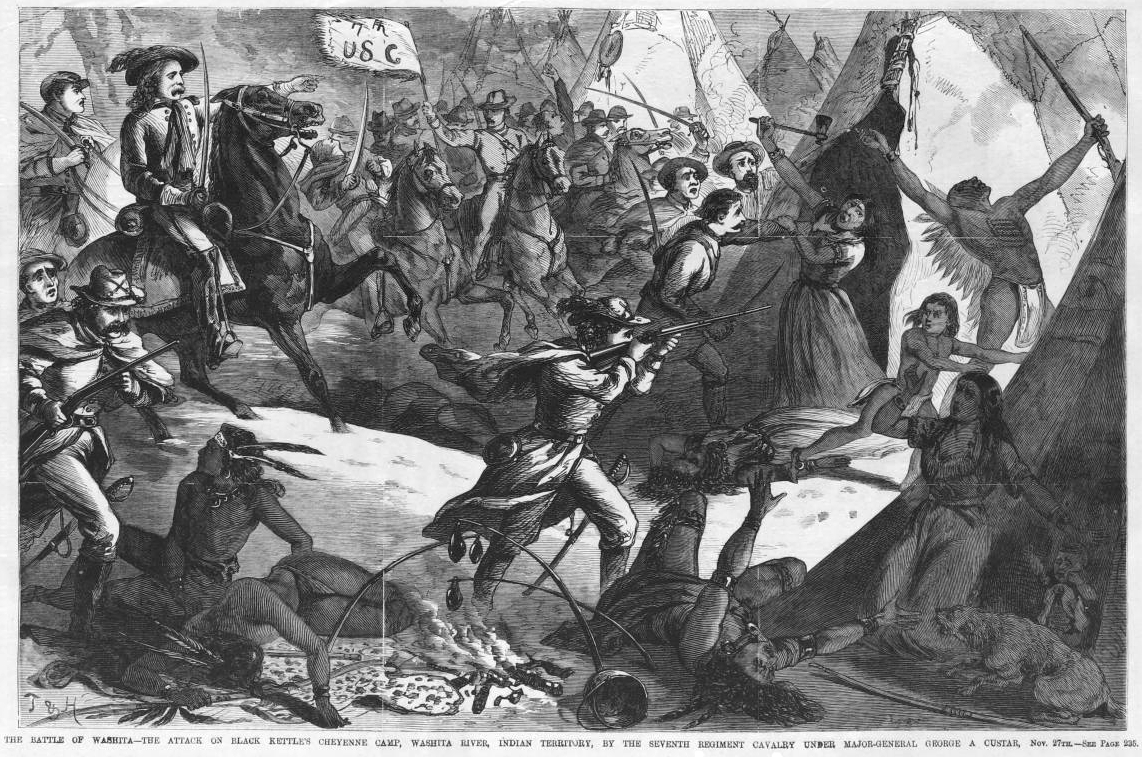
The attack on Black Kettle's Cheyenne camp, Frank Leslie's Illustrated Newspaper

On November 26, 1868, Custer's Osage scouts located the trail of an Indian war party. Custer's troops followed this trail all day without a break until nightfall, when they rested briefly until there was sufficient moonlight to continue. They followed the trail to Black Kettle's village, where Custer divided his force into four parts, moving each into position so that at first daylight they could simultaneously converge on the village. At daybreak, as the columns attacked, Double Wolf awoke and fired his gun to alert the village; he was among the first to die in the charge. The cavalry musicians played "Garryowen" to signal the attack. The Cheyenne warriors hurriedly left their lodges to take cover behind trees and in deep ravines. Custer soon controlled the village, but it took longer to quell all remaining resistance.

The Osage, enemies to the Cheyenne, were at war with most of the Plains tribes. The Osage scouts led Custer toward the village, hearing sounds and smelling smoke from the camp long before the soldiers. The Osage did not participate in the initial attack, fearing that the soldiers would mistake them for Cheyenne and shoot them. Instead, they waited behind the color-bearer of the 7th US Cavalry on the north side of the river until the village was taken. The Osage rode into the village, where they took scalps and helped the soldiers round up fleeing Cheyenne women and children.

Black Kettle and his wife, Medicine Woman, were shot in the back and killed while fleeing on a pony. Following the capture of Black Kettle's village, Custer was in a precarious position. As the fighting began to subside, he saw large groups of mounted Indians gathering on nearby hilltops and learned that Black Kettle's village was only one of many Indian encampments along the river, where thousands of Indians had gathered. Fearing an attack, he ordered some of his men to take defensive positions while the others seized the Indians' property and horses. They destroyed what they did not want or could not carry, slaughtering about 675 ponies and horses. They spared 200 horses to carry prisoners.

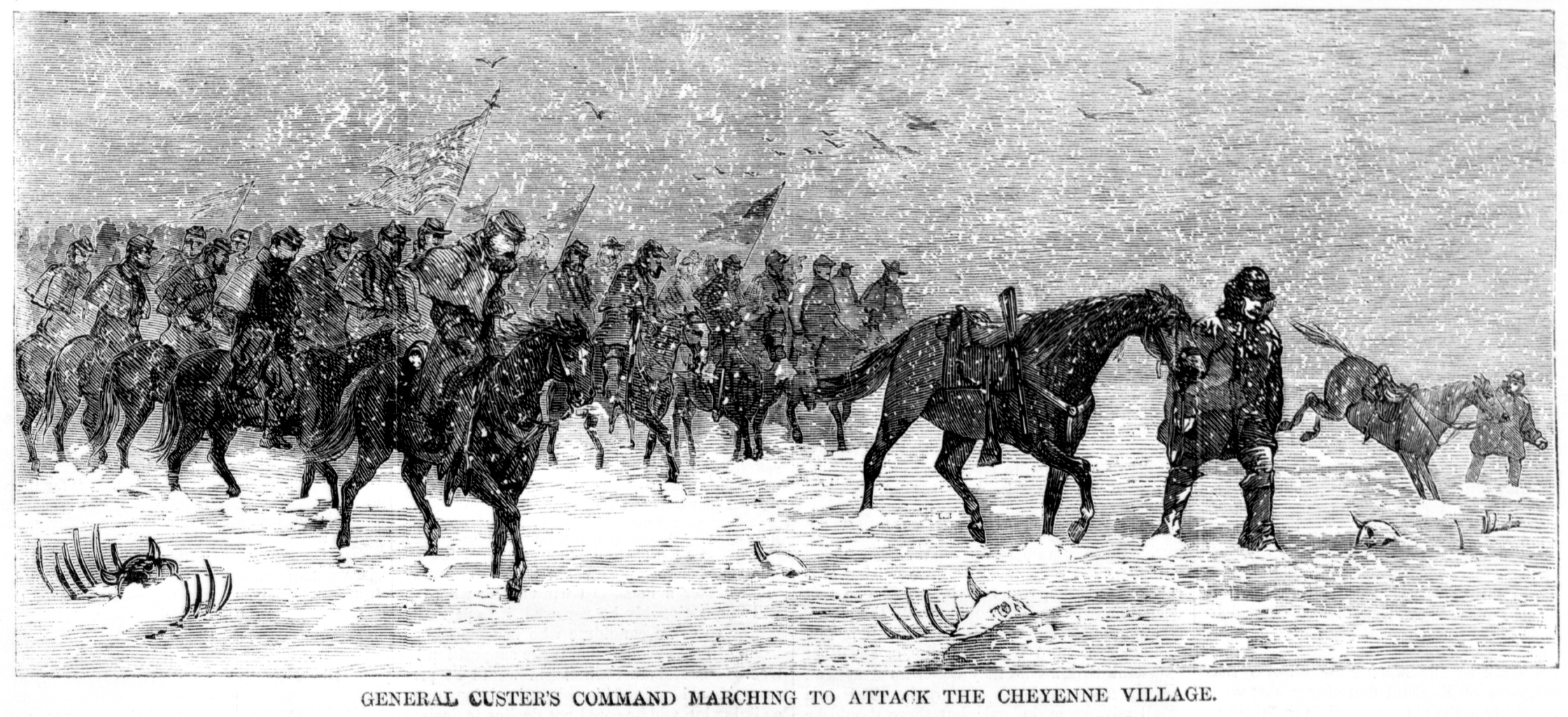
General Custer Marching to Cheyenne Village, 1868

Near nightfall, fearing the outlying Indians would find and attack his supply train, Custer began marching his forces toward the other encampments. The surrounding Indians retreated, at which point Custer turned around and returned to his supply train.

In his first report of the battle to Gen. Sheridan on November 28, 1868, Custer reported that by "actual and careful examination after the battle", his men had found the bodies of 103 warriors – a figure repeated by Sheridan when he relayed news of the Washita fight to Bvt. Maj. Gen. W.A. Nichols the following day. In fact, no count of the dead had been made. The reported number was based on Custer's reports from his officers the day after the attack, during their return to Camp Supply. Cheyenne and other Indian estimates of the Indian casualties at the Washita, as well as estimates by Custer's civilian scouts, are much lower.

According to a modern account by the U.S. Army Center of Military History, the 7th Cavalry had 21 officers and men killed and 13 wounded at the Washita. They estimated the Indians had perhaps 50 killed and as many wounded. Twenty of the soldiers killed were part of a small detachment led by Major Joel Elliott, who was among the dead. Elliott had separated from the three companies he led, apparently without Custer's approval. Yelling "Here's for a brevet or a coffin!", Elliott and his small band pursued a group of fleeing Cheyenne. Elliott's contingent ran into a mixed party of Cheyenne, Kiowa, and Arapaho warriors who were rushing from villages up the river to aid Black Kettle's encampment. The warriors overwhelmed the small troop in a single charge.

Custer's abrupt withdrawal without determining the fate of Elliott and the missing troopers darkened Custer's reputation among his peers. There was deep resentment within the 7th Cavalry that never healed. In particular, Frederick Benteen, Eliott's friend and H Company captain, never forgave Custer for "abandoning" Elliott and his troopers. Eight years later, when Benteen failed to race to Custer's aid at the Battle of the Little Bighorn, his actions were closely examined in light of his long-standing anger toward Custer for the events at the Washita River.

== Role of Indian noncombatants in Custer's strategy ==
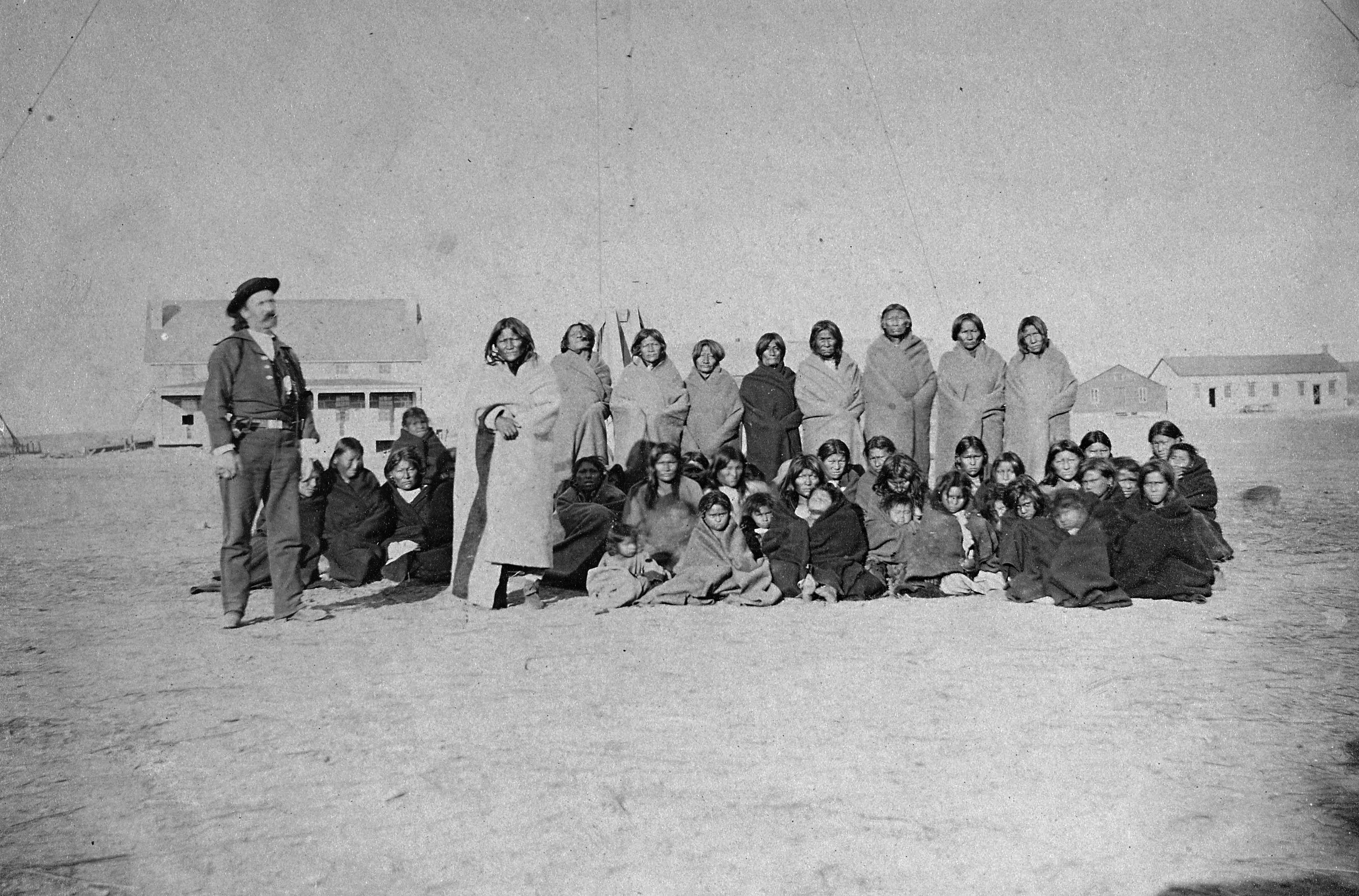
Cheyenne captives, taken at Fort Dodge, Kansas en route to the stockade at Fort Hays; to the left stands U.S. Army chief of scouts John O. Austin.

The Southern Cheyenne encampment on the Washita River comprised a key component in Custer's field strategy – Indian noncombatants included many women, children, and the elderly or disabled. Custer targeted them for capture to serve as hostages and human shields. Custer's battalions intended to "ride into the camp and secure noncombatant hostages" and "forc[e] the warriors to surrender". Custer demonstrated the value at the Battle of the Washita of a strategy that used "capture[d] women and children" to "neutralize" the Southern Cheyenne superiority in numbers over the US military.

Author James Donovan describes the 53 women and children seized at the Washita as "captives" or "prisoners." They were used by Custer to ensure the escape of his regiment as Cheyenne forces from nearby villages began "pressing his position". Historian Jerome Greene spelled out their function: "... fifty-three women and children taken captive at the Washita served as assurance against attack from the downriver [Indians] during Custer's extrication of his command from the scene late on November 27." As Custer advanced with his regiment in a mock assault – mounted women and children hostages riding among his troops – the warriors dispersed, "afraid that shots directed against the column might hit the prisoners".

Larry Sklenar, in his narrative of the Washita battle, also describes the role of "hostages" as human shields:

Custer probably could not have pulled off this tactical coup [at the Washita] had he not had in his possession the fifty-some women and children captives. Although not hostages in the narrowest meaning of the word, doubtlessly it occurred to Custer that the family-oriented [Cheyenne] warriors would not attack the Seventh [Cavalry] with the women and children marching in [the middle of his column].

Custer provided the military logic for tactical use of human shields in his book My Life on the Plains, published two years before the Battle of the Little Big Horn:

Indians contemplating a battle, either offensive or defensive, are always anxious to have their women and children removed from all danger…For this reason I decided to locate our [military] camp as close as convenient to [Chief Black Kettle's Cheyenne] village, knowing that the close proximity of their women and children, and their necessary exposure in case of conflict, would operate as a powerful argument in favor of peace, when the question of peace or war came to be discussed.

General Phil Sheridan, commander of the Department of the Missouri, issued orders for the Washita River expedition, including the following: "to destroy [Indian] villages and ponies, to kill or hang all warriors, and to bring back all woman and children [survivors]." The purpose of this "total war" strategy was to make "all segments of Indian society experience the horrors of war as fully as the warriors".

Benjamin "Ben" Clark, the highly regarded scout and guide attached to the Seventh Cavalry, recalled that women and children were not spared being killed at the Washita: "[T]he regiment galloped through the tepees ... firing indiscriminately and killing men and women alike." One cavalry unit was seen pursuing "a group of women and children," shooting at them and "killing them without mercy". Lieutenant Edward Godfrey observed that soldiers made no effort "to prevent hitting women" during the attack.

Ben Clark reported "the loss of seventy-five [Cheyenne] warriors dead, and fully as many women and children killed". Greene notes that "all warriors who lay wounded in the village – presumably no matter the extent of their injuries" were (according to Clark's testimony) "promptly shot to death". This was consistent with Sheridan's orders to kill or summarily hang all [captured] warriors. The Seventh Cavalry tactical engagement of noncombatants contributed to the effective "destruction" of Black Kettle's village – it "ceased to exist".

Colonel Ranald Mackenzie, with elements of the Fourth Cavalry, emulated the success – and methods – of the Battle of the Washita in the lead-up to the Red River War at the battle of North Fork, near McClellan Creek, Texas, in 1872. Applying similar tactics of taking captives, Mackenzie's command of 284 men attacked a Comanche village of 262 lodges and 500 warriors, capturing 130 women and children. The captives served both as human shields, as Mackenzie withdrew to his supply base, and as hostages, offered as a "bargaining tool to force the off-reservation Indians back to reservation, and to force them to free white captives".

== Controversies ==
=== Indian casualties at the Washita ===
The number of Indian casualties at the Washita reported by Custer has been controversial. In his first report of the battle to Gen. Sheridan on November 28, 1868, Custer reported that by "actual and careful examination after the battle," the bodies of 103 warriors were found – a figure echoed by Sheridan when from Camp Supply he relayed news of the Washita fight to Bvt. Maj. Gen. W.A. Nichols the following day. In fact, no battlefield count of the dead was made. According to Lt. Edward S. Godfrey, no estimate of Indian warrior fatalities was made until the evening of the day following the battle, after the soldiers made camp during their march back to Camp Supply. "On [the] second night [after the battle]," Godfrey told interviewer Walter M. Camp in 1917, "Custer interrogated the officers as to what Indians they had seen dead in the village, and it was from these reports that the official report of Indians killed was made up. The dead Indians on the field were not counted by the troops then, but guessed at later, as explained."

In his 1928 memoir, Godfrey related, "After supper in the evening, the officers were called together and each one questioned as to the casualties of enemy warriors, locations, etc. Every effort was made to avoid duplications. The total was found to be one hundred and three." Captain Benteen stated, in annotations to his personal copy of W.L. Holloway's Wild Life on the Plains and Horrors of Indian Warfare, that "Custer assembled the officers to inquire of each how many dead Indians each had seen; then what each had seen were added. They had all seen the same dead Indians." [emphasis in original].

John Poisal and Jack Fitzpatrick, mixed-blood scouts attached to the Seventh Cavalry, reported a different number of Indian casualties to scout J.S. Morrison when they arrived at Fort Dodge with the Cheyenne prisoners. In a letter to Indian Agent Col. Edward W. Wynkoop on December 14, 1868, Morrison wrote,

John Smith, John Poysell [Poisal], and Jack Fitzpatrick have got in today. John S. was not in the [Washita] fight, but John P. and Jack were. They all agree in stating that the official reports of the fight were very much exaggerated; that there were not over twenty bucks killed; the rest, about 40, were women and children.

The Cheyenne prisoners, interviewed by Gen. Sheridan at Camp Supply, reported 13 Cheyenne men, two Sioux, and one Arapaho killed at the Washita, a figure which Sheridan subsequently reported to Bvt. Maj. Gen. Nichols. The journalist DeB. Randolph Keim interviewed the women prisoners with the help of interpreter Richard Curtis. He obtained the names of those killed and arrived at the same figure of 13 Cheyenne, two Sioux, and one Arapaho killed. Later information from various Cheyenne sources, most of them independent of each other, tended to confirm the figures given by the Cheyenne women prisoners. Few of the military reports noted casualties among the women and children. Custer acknowledged in his report, "In the excitement of the fight, as well as in self-defence, it so happened that some of the squaws and a few of the children were killed and wounded...."

After Custer and Sheridan visited the battlefield in December, Custer revised his initial estimate of 103 warriors killed upward. He wrote from Fort Cobb,

The Indians admit a loss of 140 killed, besides a heavy loss of wounded. This, with the Indian prisoners we have in our possession, makes the entire loss of the Indian in killed, wounded, and missing not far from 300.

Hoig points out that if true, the number would mean that virtually everyone in Black Kettle's village was killed or captured. Greene states, "Custer's figures were inflated, and the specific sources of his information remain unknown."

Hardorff notes questions about this total.

This new number was based on information obtained from two imprisoned Kiowa chiefs at Fort Cobb who faced death by hanging. In view of their predicament, it seems likely that these men would have said anything to avoid the gallows. But such skepticism is not warranted in the case of the Washita prisoners. The Cheyenne women were allowed to mingle freely with the officers and knew many of them on an intimate basis. They were assured good treatment and had no apparent reason to distort their statements about dead kinsmen.

Greene finds the Cheyenne and other Indian estimates most reliable. He writes, "As might be expected, the best estimates must come from the people who suffered the losses," though noting, "even these do not agree." Utley, however, writes, "Indian calculations – a dozen warriors and twice as many women and children killed – are as improbably low as Custer's are high." Hoig writes, "Even though the number 103 was not arrived at by a precise battlefield count, it is a definite figure which has already been placed on historical markers of the battlefield. Since it will likely never be proved absolutely incorrect, the figure will undoubtedly remain accepted as the number of Indians killed by Custer at the Washita. History should make it clear, however, that the dead were by no means all warriors who were met in open battle and defeated."

Several of the Cheyenne accounts provide names of men killed at the Washita. In his book on the Washita, Greene provides an appendix of "Known Village Fatalities at the Washita." He compiled a list of all unique names, for a total of 40 men, 12 women (of whom 11 are unidentified), and six unidentified children. Greene notes that some individuals might have more than one name, so some entries might be duplicates. Using the same sources, Richard G. Hardorff has compiled a "Composite List of Names." It partially reconciles multiple names (or multiple translations of the same name) among the different sources; for example, the Mexican Pilan, with Indian names White Bear and Tall White Man; or Bitter Man/Cranky Man, also known as Bad Man. Writes Hardorff, "Some of the dead may have been identified by their birth name by one informant and by their nickname by another. Variations in the translation of personal names add to the confusion in the identification...."

Estimates of Indian casualties in the Battle of the Washita according to contemporary sources
Source	Date of estimate	Men	Women	Children	Total
Lt. Col. G.A. Custer, 7th Cavalry	November 28, 1868	103	some	few	103+
Women captives, via interpreter Richard Curtis and New York Herald reporter DeB. Randolph Kleim	December 1, 1868	13 Cheyenne; 2 Sioux; 1 Arapaho	n/a	n/a	16
Maj. Gen. Philip H. Sheridan, Division of the Missouri	December 3, 1868	13 Cheyenne; 2 Sioux; 1 Arapaho	n/a	n/a	16
Black Eagle (Kiowa), via interpreter Philip McCusker	December 3, 1868	11 Cheyenne; 3 Arapaho	many	many	14+
Capt. Henry E. Alvord, 10th Cavalry	December 12, 1868 (rev. April 4, 1874)	80 Cheyenne; 1 Comanche; 1 Kiowa	n/a	n/a	81 (82)
John Poisal and Jack Fitzpatrick, scouts attached to 7th Cavalry, via J.S. Morrison	December 14, 1868	20	40 women and children		60
Lt. Col. G.A. Custer, 7th Cavalry	December 22, 1868	140	some	few	140+
Unidentified Cheyennes, via Col. Benjamin H. Grierson, 10th Cavalry	April 6, 1869	18	n/a	n/a	18
Red Moon, Minimic, Gray Eyes, Little Robe (Cheyenne) via Vincent Colyer, Special Indian Commissioner	April 9, 1869	13	16	9	38
Benjamin H. Clark, chief of scouts attached to 7th Cavalry	1899	75	75 women and children		150
Dennis Lynch, private, 7th Cavalry	1909	106	some	n/a	106+
Med Elk Pipe, Red Shin (?) via George Bent/George Hyde	1913	11	12	6	29
Crow Neck (?), via George Bent/George Bird Grinnell	1914	11 Cheyenne; 2 Arapaho; 1 Mexican	10 Cheyenne; 2 Sioux	5	31
Packer/She Wolf (Cheyenne), via George Bent	1916	10 Cheyenne; 2 Arapaho; 1 Mexican	n/a	n/a	13
Magpie/Little Beaver (Cheyenne), via Charles Brill	1930	15	n/a	n/a	15
Source: Appendix G table, "Aggregate Totals", Hardorff 2006, p. 403. Source table modified by arranging in chronological order, providing sources for each estimate, and color-coding to differentiate between type of source.
Key: / Military estimates / Estimates of civilian scouts attached to 7th Cavalry / Indian estimates

=== Battle or massacre? ===
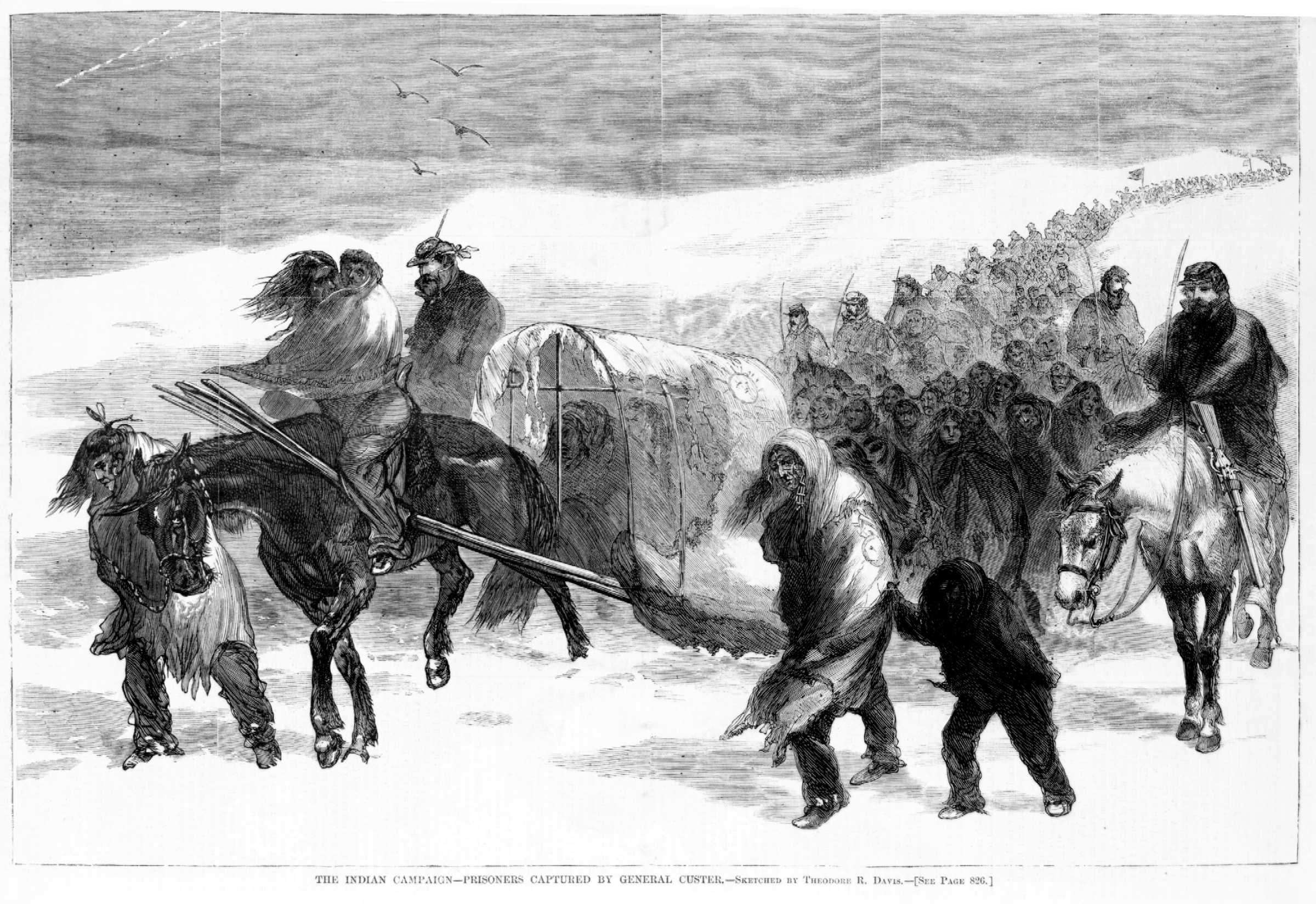
The Indian Campaign, an 1868 sketch by Theodore R. Davis

Following the event, a controversy arose as to whether the event was best described as a military victory or as a massacre. This discussion endures among historians to this day.

The Indian Bureau described the event as a "massacre of innocent Indians", and humanitarian groups denounced it as "cold-blooded butchery". The Cheyenne survivors considered it a horrifying event that gravely impacted their lives and community; the loss of many tribal elders, in particular, was profoundly damaging to Cheyenne families and society. Modern Cheyenne consider the event a massacre and are campaigning to change the name of the historical site to reflect that view.

Custer himself did not consider Washita a massacre, stating that he did not kill every Indian in the village, though he said his forces could not avoid killing a few women in the middle of the hard fight. He said that some women took up weapons and were subsequently killed and that he took women and children prisoners. In his book about the encounter, published in 2004 for the National Park Service, historian Jerome Greene concluded that "Soldiers evidently took measures to protect the women and children."

By early December 1868, the attack had provoked debate and criticism in the press. In the December 9 Leavenworth Evening Bulletin, an article noted: "Gen. S. Sandford and Tappan, and Col. Taylor of the Indian Peace Commission, unite in the opinion that the late battle with the Indians was simply an attack upon peaceful bands, which were on the march to their new reservations". The December 14 New York Tribune reported, "Col. Wynkoop, agent for the Cheyenne and Arapahos Indians, has published his letter of resignation. He regards Gen. Custer's late fight as simply a massacre, and says that Black Kettle and his band, friendly Indians, were, when attacked, on their way to their reservation." The scout James S. Morrison wrote Indian Agent Col. Wynkoop that twice as many women and children as warriors had been killed during the attack.

In Custer's direct frontal assault on an armed and ostensibly hostile encampment, the only fatality in the 7th Cavalry in the fighting in the village itself was squadron commander Captain Louis McLane Hamilton, a grandson of American founding father Alexander Hamilton. The rest of the dead were with the detached command of Maj. Joel Elliott, who (as noted above) were killed more than a mile from the fighting in the village. Companies A and D, composed of 120 officers and men, suffered only four wounded in the assault, and attacking Companies C and K, also totaling 120 officers and men, suffered no casualties.

Historian Paul Andrew Hutton wrote, "Although the fight on the Washita was most assuredly one-sided, it was not a massacre. Black Kettle's Cheyennes were not unarmed innocents living under the impression that they were not at war. Several of Black Kettle's warriors had recently fought the soldiers, and the chief had been informed by Hazen that there could be no peace until he surrendered to Sheridan. The soldiers were not under orders to kill everyone, for Custer personally stopped the slaying of noncombatants, and fifty-three prisoners were taken by the troops."

Historian Joseph B. Thoburn considers the destruction of Black Kettle's village too one-sided to be called a battle. He reasons that had a superior force of Indians attacked a white settlement containing no more people than were in Black Kettle's camp, with like results, the incident would doubtless have been heralded as "a massacre". Historian Stan Hoig argues that the conflict fit the definition of a massacre because a group of people, even one in possession of weapons as the Cheyenne were, were killed "indiscriminately, mercilessly and in large numbers".

== In popular culture ==
During the late 20th century, a time of activism for Native American and minority civil rights, and protests about the Vietnam War, film and other media reflected changes in historians' perspective on the Battle of Washita River. They also used the event to reflect on contemporary issues. In the 1970 film Little Big Man, based on the 1964 novel by Thomas Berger, director Arthur Penn depicted the Seventh Cavalry's attack on Black Kettle's village on the Washita as a massacre resembling the 1968 My Lai massacre by U.S. troops in Vietnam.

John Jakes described the battle as a massacre in the final book of the North and South trilogy, Heaven and Hell, published in 1987.

The television series Dr. Quinn, Medicine Woman aired a special double-episode entitled "Washita" on April 29, 1995. The episode set the scene of the Washita attack in Colorado instead of Oklahoma, the site of the battle. It fictionalized Custer as deliberately misleading Colorado settlers about the difference between Black Kettle and his band, depicted as peaceful, and the Dog Soldiers, who were attacking farms and railroad crews. Lead character Dr. Michaela "Mike" Quinn made futile attempts to argue with Custer and to warn Black Kettle of impending massacre.

In the 2003 film The Last Samurai, Tom Cruise plays Captain Nathan Algren, a veteran of the 7th Cavalry of the 1860s. His participation in the Washita action, depicted as a massacre, leaves him haunted by nightmares.

== See also ==
- Clara Blinn
- Sand Creek Massacre
- List of battles fought in Oklahoma
