= Joel Elliott =

American army officer (1840–1868)

Joel Haworth Elliott
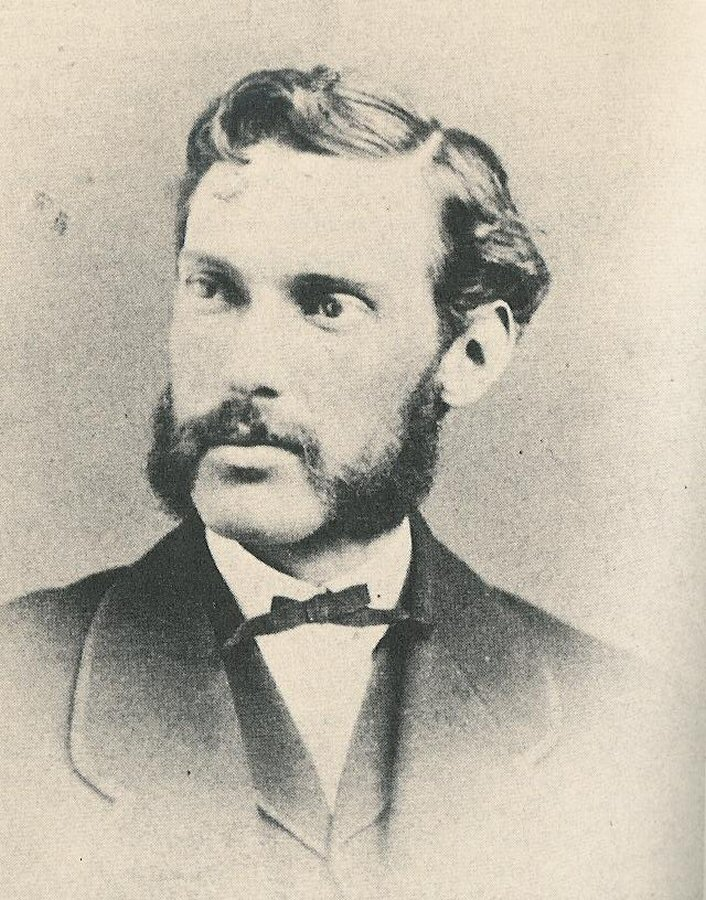
- Born: October 27, 1840; Centerville, Indiana
- Died: November 27, 1868 (aged 28); White Rock along the banks of the Washita River, Indian Territory (NW of Cheyenne, Oklahoma)
- Burial place: White Rock, then at Fort Gibson National Cemetery, Fort Gibson, Oklahoma
- Military career
- Allegiance: United States; Union
- Branch: United States Army; Union Army
- Service years: 1861–1868
- Rank: Major
- Units: Companies G, H and M at White Rock
- Commands: 7th U.S. Cavalry,
- Conflicts: American Civil War: Battle of Brice's Crossroads (Wounded June 10, 1864); Battle of Shiloh; Battle of Perryville; Battle of Stones River; Battle of Washita River (died)

Joel Haworth Elliott (October 27, 1840 – November 27, 1868) was a Union major during and after the Civil War. Joining as a private in August 1861, with Company C, 2nd Indiana Cavalry Regiment. He saw action at the Battle of Shiloh, Battle of Perryville, Battle of Stones River, and was wounded twice. Joel Elliott was killed during the Battle of Washita River (also called the Washita Massacre), just west of present-day Cheyenne, Oklahoma, on November 27, 1868.

== Early life ==
Joel Haworth Elliott was born October 27, 1840, to devout Quakers Mark and Mary Elliott on the family farm outside Centerville, Wayne County, Indiana, approximately seventy miles east of Indianapolis, Indiana Elliott began studies at Earlham College at age 19 and taught school in the Richmond area. Being Quakers the family members were pacifists with strong antislavery views.

== Civil War ==
The Civil War began when Fort Sumter was attacked in April 1861. By August Joel Elliott enlisted as a private in Company C, 2nd Indiana Cavalry. In June 1863 he was commissioned a second lieutenant in the newly formed 7th Indiana Volunteer Cavalry Regiment and served as a recruiting officer. He quickly rose to first lieutenant and in October was commissioned captain of Company M on October 21, 1863. Elliott was mustered out of service in 1866. Indiana war governor Oliver P. Morton assisted in an appointment to major in the 7th U.S. Cavalry and George Armstrong Custer recommended his promotion.

== Battle of Washita River ==
On November 27, 1868, as second in command at the Battle of Washita River, Elliott broke off from the main body to chase fleeing Indians. Major Elliott, Sergeant Major Walter Kennedy, and sixteen other soldiers were killed and mutilated. Being under threat of losing his tactical advantage and fighting a far larger force of approaching Indians, George Custer left the area without knowing the fate of his subordinate and troops. Elliot and his men were found by Custer that December when he, accompanied by General Sheridan, led a force 1,700 strong back to the Washita.
