= Goes Ahead =

Crow Scout (1851–1919)

- Bah-suk-ush
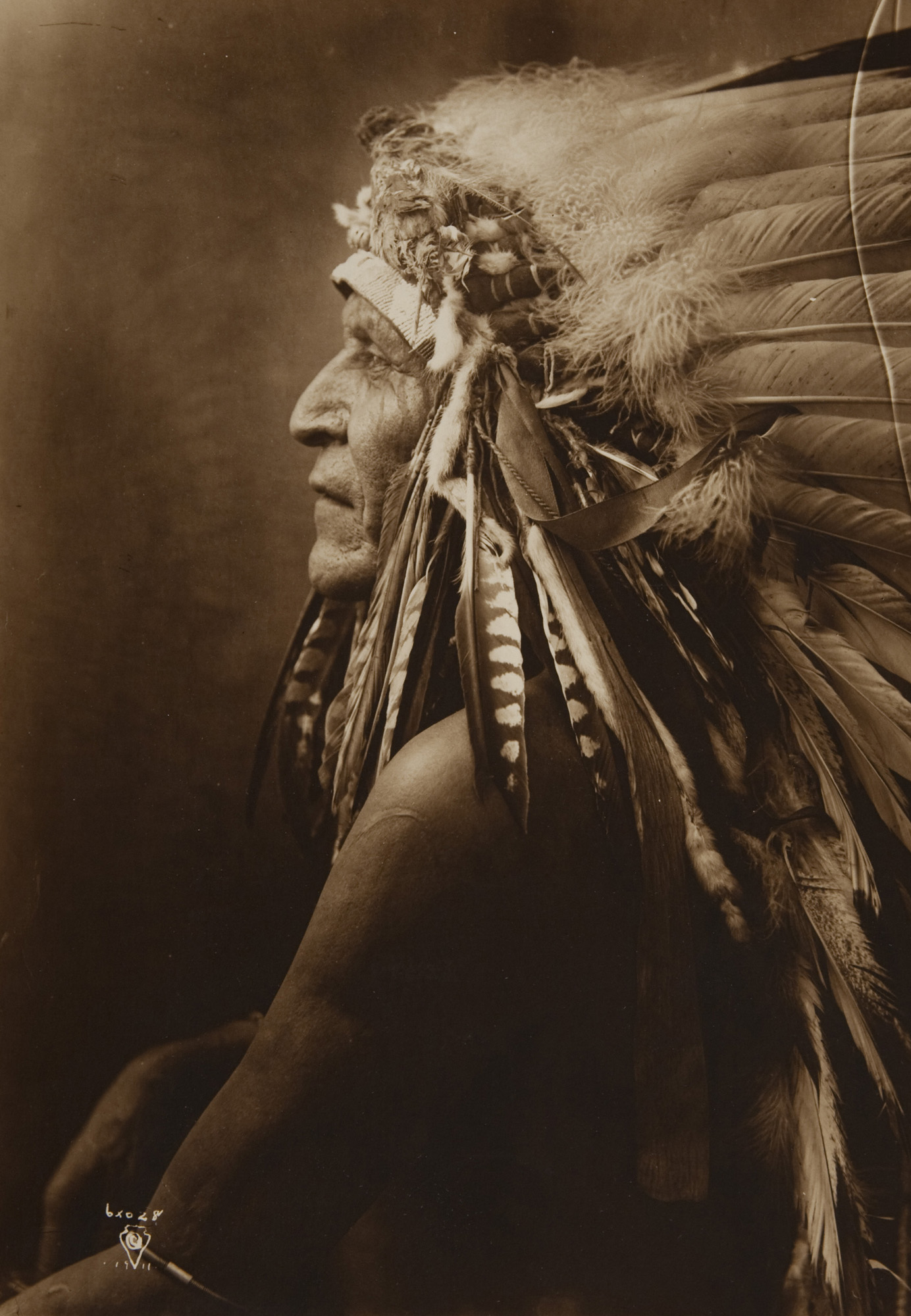
- Goes Ahead Crow tribesman (c. 1910)
- Born: c. 1851; Near the Platte River
- Died: May 31, 1919
- Resting place: Little Bighorn Battlefield
- Other names: First One, Goes First, the One Ahead, Comes Leading, Man With Fur Belt, and Walks Among the Stars
- Spouse(s): Pretty Shield, Pretty Shield's older sister
- Children: Four girls and three boys with Pretty Shield

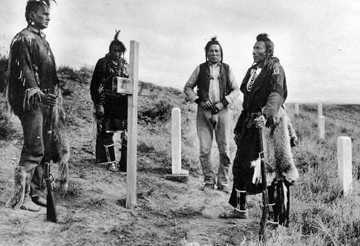
Former United States Army Crow Scouts at the Little Bighorn Battlefield. From left to right; White Man Runs Him, Hairy Moccasin, Curly and Goes Ahead.

Goes Ahead (c. 1851 – May 31, 1919) was a Crow scout for George Armstrong Custer’s 7th Cavalry during the 1876 campaign against the Sioux and Northern Cheyenne. He was a survivor of the Battle of the Little Big Horn, and his accounts of the battle are valued by modern historians.

== Biography ==
Born into the Crow tribe, he was also known as the First One, Goes First, the One Ahead, Comes Leading, Man With Fur Belt, and Walks Among the Stars. At age 16, he married Pretty Shield.

Goes Ahead volunteered on about April 10, 1876 to serve as a scout with units of the 7th Infantry of the United States Army against the traditional enemies of the Crow, the Sioux and Northern Cheyenne. On June 21, at the mouth of Rosebud Creek, six Crow scouts were detached from the 7th Infantry to go with Custer's Seventh Cavalry following the trail of a large Indian encampment up the Rosebud Creek valley. The six scouts included Goes Ahead, Hairy Moccasin, White Man Runs Him, Curly, White Swan, and Half Yellow Face (leader of the scouts). Custer's 7th Cavalry, about 650 men, were ordered to find and then engage a gathering of Sioux and Cheyenne who were expected to be on either Rosebud Creek or in the Little Bighorn valley. The six Crow scouts were sent with Custer because they were familiar with the Rosebud and Little Big Horn drainage.

On June 24, 1876 the Crow scouts were ranging ahead, and they sent back word to Custer that the trail of the Sioux/Cheyenne encampment had moved from the Rosebud valley toward the valley of the Little Bighorn. At first light on June 25, 1876, the morning of the battle, the Crow scouts were at a high point (later known as the Crows Nest) on the divide between Rosebud Creek, and the Little Big Horn. Looking sixteen miles to the west, the scouts sighted indications of a very large encampment of Sioux/Cheyenne in the valley of the Little Big Horn River near the current site of Crow Agency, Montana, though the village itself was out of sight on the valley floor. Goes Ahead and the other scouts warned Custer of the indications of the very large size of the encampment. However, Custer had also received word that morning that his force of 650 men had been sighted by Sioux/Cheyenne warriors. Custer was concerned that if he did not immediately move to the attack, the village would scatter and disperse, denying the army the armed confrontation it sought with the Sioux/Cheyenne forces.

Goes Ahead and the others took off their Army issued uniforms and put on traditional Crow clothing with eagle feathers to assist their flight to the spirit world should they be killed. When Custer saw this, he was enraged seeing the move as defeatism and he dismissed the scouts. Goes Ahead and the others joined Major Marcus Reno on the ridge overlooking the last stand. Attacked but not overrun, most of Reno’s men survived the engagement. According to Pretty Shield, Goes Ahead fell back and fought alongside some packers shielded by mule carcasses but had been an eyewitness to Custer's death at the sides of Mitch Boyer and a flag-bearer; she narrates among many other details, "My man, Goes-ahead, was with Son-of-the-morning-star when he rode down to the water of the Little Bighorn. He heard a Lacota call out to Two-bodies [i.e. according to Frank Bird Linderman, Boyer], who rode beside Son-of-the-morning-star, 'Go back, or you will die.' But Son-of-the-morning-star went ahead,..and he died there, died in the water of the Little Bighorn [emphasis original].... [He] told me that he was afraid; and yet he did not run away until he saw Son-of-the-morning star fall down from his horse into the water of the Little Bighorn. He told me that Son-of-the-morning star was ahead of his men, and that when he fell, the blue horse-soldiers ran back up the hill. He took me to the place, and showed me exactly where Son-of-the-morning-star fell into the water, with Two-bodies and the flag.... .

After the battle, Goes Ahead settled on the Crow reservation, married and raised a family. He was interviewed by historian and photographer Edward S. Curtis in the early 20th century. His book was one of the first to present a balanced account of the battle to the general public, but even then, the more controversial parts of his story were not disclosed. The whole account of Curtis's interviews with Goes Ahead and the other Crow scouts would not become general knowledge until Curtis's notes became public in the 1990s, more than 40 years after his death.

Goes Ahead died in 1919 and was buried in the military cemetery at the Little Big Horn Battlefield. His widow, Pretty Shield, became a sought after source of information concerning the battle late in her life.

== See also ==
- White Swan
- Half Yellow Face
