= La Force =

La Force is French for the Force.

La Force can refer to:

== Places ==
- La Force, Aude, commune in southern France.
- La Force, Dordogne, commune in southwestern France
- La Force Prison, former prison in Paris

== People ==
- Duc de La Force was a peerage of France
- Jacques-Nompar de Caumont, duc de la Force (1558-1652), marshal of France and peer of France
- Armand-Nompar de Caumont, duc de la Force (c. 1580-1675), first son of Jacques-Nompar, peer and marshal of France
- Charlotte-Rose de Caumont La Force or Mademoiselle de La Force (1654 - 1724), a French writer
- Ariel Engle, a Canadian musician who used the stage name La Force for her debut solo album in 2018

== Sports teams ==
- Los Angeles Force, an American soccer club playing in the National Independent Soccer Association

== See also ==
- Strength (tarot card), labeled LA FORCE in some decks
- Laforce, municipality in Quebec, Canada
- LaForce, surname
