= LeForce =

LeForce is a surname. Notable people with the name include:

- Clyde LeForce (1923–2006), American football quarterback in the NFL
- Alan LeForce (born 1935), American former college basketball coach and athletic director

== See also ==
- Thomas Leforge (1850–1931), American writer
- La-Force, surname
- LaForce, surname
- Laforce, municipality in northwestern Quebec, Canada
