= White Man Runs Him =

Crow warrior

- Mahr-Itah-Thee-Dah-Ka-Roosh
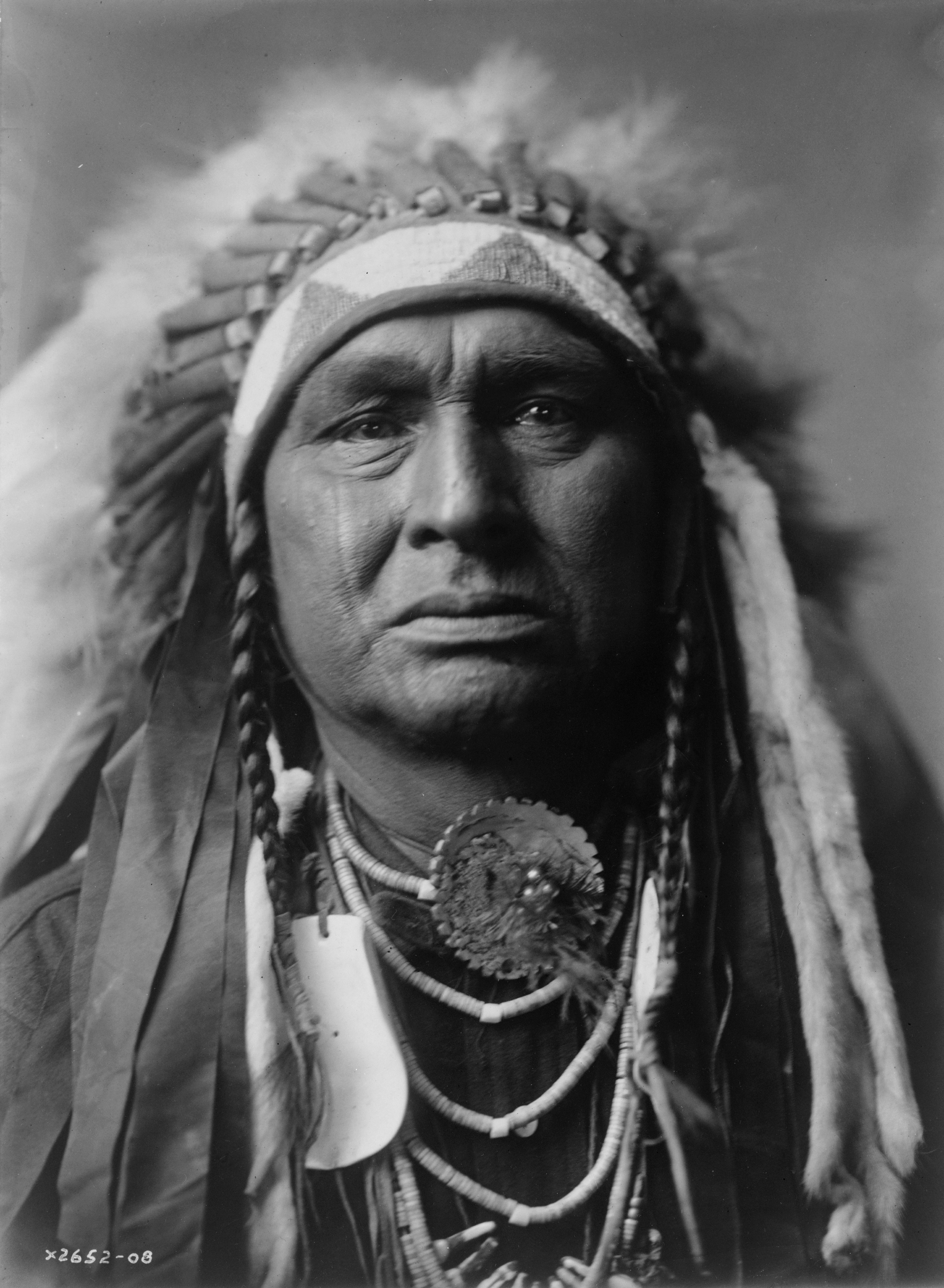
- Edward S. Curtis portrait of White Man Runs Him, c. 1908

Crow leader

Personal details
- Born: c. 1858 Lodge Grass, Montana, US
- Died: June 2, 1929 (aged 70–71) Crow Indian Reservation
- Resting place: Little Bighorn Battlefield
- Spouse(s): Pretty Medicine Pipe, d. Apr. 2, 1943
- Relations: Stepgrandfather of Joe Medicine Crow; grandfather of Pauline Small; great-grandfather of Janine Pease
- Parent(s): Bull Chief, Offers Her Red Cloth
- Known for: Scout for George Armstrong Custer at the Battle of the Little Bighorn
- Nickname: White Buffalo That Turns Around

White Man Runs Him (Mahr-Itah-Thee-Dah-Ka-Roosh; c. 1858 – June 2, 1929) was a Crow scout serving with George Armstrong Custer's 1876 expedition against the Sioux and Northern Cheyenne that culminated in the Battle of the Little Bighorn.

== Early life ==
Also known as White Buffalo That Turns Around, he was born into the Big Lodge Clan of the Crow Nation, the son of Bull Chief and Offers Her Red Cloth. At the age of about 18, he volunteered to serve as a scout with the United States Army on April 10, 1876, in its campaign against the Sioux and Northern Cheyenne, traditional enemies of the Crow.

== Service as a scout ==
White Man Runs Him enlisted on April 10, 1876, at the Crow Agency, Montana Territory, for two months in the 7th US Infantry. On June 21, 1876, he was transferred to Custer's 7th US Cavalry as part of a contingent of six Crow warrior/scouts, including Goes Ahead, Curly, Hairy Moccasin, White Swan, and Half Yellow Face, the leader of the scouts. He scouted for Lieutenant Charles Varnum's column in the days preceding the battle. In the early morning hours of June 25, 1876, he and other Crow scouts accompanied Varnum and Custer to the Crow's Nest, a high point on the Little Bighorn/Rosebud Creek divide, from which the Little Bighorn Valley could be viewed at a distance of about seventeen air miles. The scouts could see indications of a large horse herd and the smoke of many morning fires, though the encampment was hidden from view on the valley floor. The Crow scouts advised Custer that the encampment was vast. Custer prepared to attack, however. Custer was concerned that during the morning of June 25, Sioux/Cheyenne warriors had detected the presence of his 650-man force, and if he did not promptly attack, the villagers would scatter, thus denying the army the confrontation it sought with the Sioux/Cheyenne forces.

According to White Man Runs Him's accounts, after sending Major Marcus Reno's column to attack the settlement first, Custer headed down Medicine Trail Creek to engage the Sioux and Cheyenne. White Man Runs Him recounts that he and the other Crow scouts intended to follow Custer down into battle but that their chief scout, Mitch Boyer, ordered them to rejoin the pack train instead.

Another, more colorful version of the story relates that the Crow scouts were convinced they were about to die in battle against such a large force of Sioux, so they took off their uniforms and donned Crow war clothing. When Custer demanded to know why, they responded that they wished to die as warriors rather than soldiers. Custer was angered by what he perceived as fatalism and relieved them from further service about an hour before engaging in the final battle.

White Man Runs Him retired to a ridge along with Goes Ahead, Hairy Moccasin, and Strikes That Bear (an Arikara scout) to join Major Reno. They were engaged briefly in battle but survived the engagement. He then joined Colonel John Gibbon's column.

== Later life ==
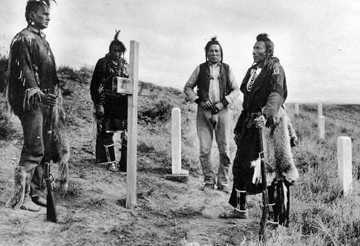
Crow scouts visit the Little Bighorn Battlefield about 1913. Left to right: White-Man-Runs-Him, Hairy Moccasin, Curley, and Goes Ahead

After the battle, he lived on the Crow reservation near Lodge Grass, Montana. He was the stepgrandfather of Joe Medicine Crow, a Crow tribal historian who used his grandfather's stories as a basis for his later histories of the battle, and grandfather to Pauline Small, the first woman elected to office in the Crow Tribe of Montana. His status as a Little Big Horn survivor made him a minor celebrity late in life, and he even made a cameo appearance in the 1927 Hollywood movie The Red Raiders.

White Man Runs Him lived the remainder of his life on the Crow Reservation in the Big Horn Valley region of Montana, just a few miles from the site of the famous battle. He died there in 1929.

== Legacy ==
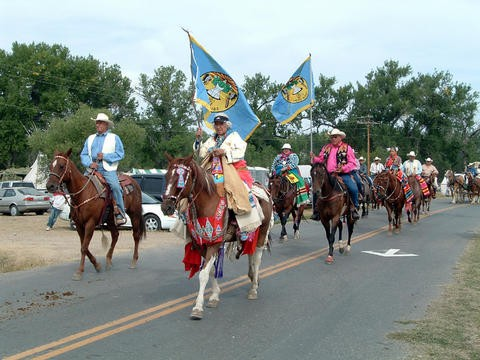
Granddaughter Pauline Small carrying the flag of the Crow people

White Man Runs Him was buried in the cemetery at the Little Big Horn Battlefield. His account of the battle is told in the work "The Custer Myth" by C. Graham, on pages 20 to 24," and also in It Is a Good Day to Die: Indian Eyewitnesses Tell the Story of the Battle of the Little Bighorn.

A slough near Lodge Grass, Montana, is known as Baaishtashíilinkuluush Alaaxúa ("Where Whiteman Runs Him Hid"). A coulee, Baaishtashíilinkuluush Isalasáh te, which is named after him, is also known as "Whiteman's Creek".
