= Mitch Bouyer =

US Army interpreter (1837-1876)

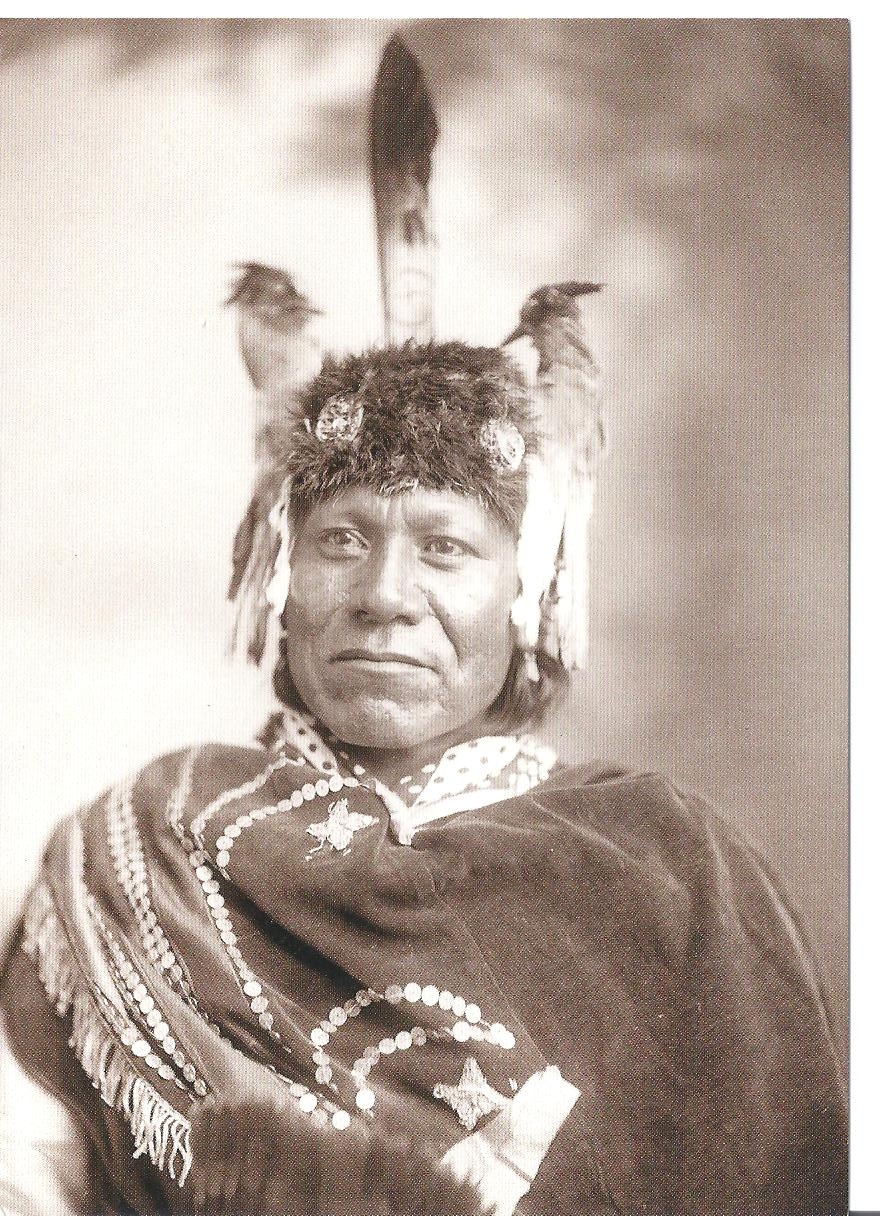
This c.1895-1899 portrait by Charles A. Nast of A-ca-po-re, a Ute musician, is often misidentified as Mitch Bouyer.

Mitch Boyer (sometimes spelled 'Bowyer', 'Buoyer', 'Bouyer' or 'Buazer', or in Creole, 'Boye'; Dakota: Kar-pash) (c. 1837 – June 25, 1876) was an interpreter and guide in the Old West following the American Civil War. General John Gibbon called him "next to Jim Bridger, the best guide in the country". He was killed at the Battle of the Little Bighorn.

== Family background ==
He was born Michel Boyer in c. 1837. His father, Jean-Baptiste Boyer, was a French Canadian who was employed by the American Fur Company, trading with Sioux in the area that would later become Wyoming. Mitch's mother was a Santee Dakota. His father was killed by Native Americans while trapping, about 1863. Mitch's Dakota name was Kar-pash. He had three full sisters: Marie, Anne, and Thérèse, who seem to have been triplets born in 1840. He also had at least two half-brothers: John Boyer (c. 1845-1871), who was hanged at Fort Laramie for killing an Army scout in the first legal execution in Wyoming Territory, and Antoine Boyer (born 1852?), whom Walter Mason Camp interviewed in 1912. John, in an interview just before he was hanged, stated that there had been other siblings who had already died.

Boyer was an interpreter at Fort Phil Kearny in 1868. In the fall of 1869, he married a young Crow woman named Magpie Outside (or Magpie Out-of-Doors), who became known as Mary. Their first child, also named Mary, was born in 1870. Sometime later they also had a son, apparently named Tom, but eventually called James LeForge (see below).

== Army scout and death at the Little Big Horn ==
Boyer became a guide for the 2nd U.S. Cavalry, working with the Northern Pacific Railroad's survey team. From 1872 on he was employed by the Crow Agency and the US Army.

In 1876 Lt. Col. George Armstrong Custer requested that Boyer be transferred to the 7th U.S. Cavalry as an interpreter for the Crow scouts when Gen. Alfred Terry ordered the 7th south from the Montana Column to search for hostile Indians. Custer's regular scouts were Ree (Arikara). However, for this mission, Terry had assigned six of Lt. James Bradley's Crow scouts to the 7th (including Curley). Boyer had the additional bonus of knowing the country well.

When Custer's command was divided into 3 battalions, about noon, Boyer was assigned to accompany Custer, whose battalion would be almost completely wiped out. There were only about a dozen survivors of Custer's battalion, all of whom had left it before the battle began. Boyer stayed with Custer and was killed in the Battle of the Little Big Horn.

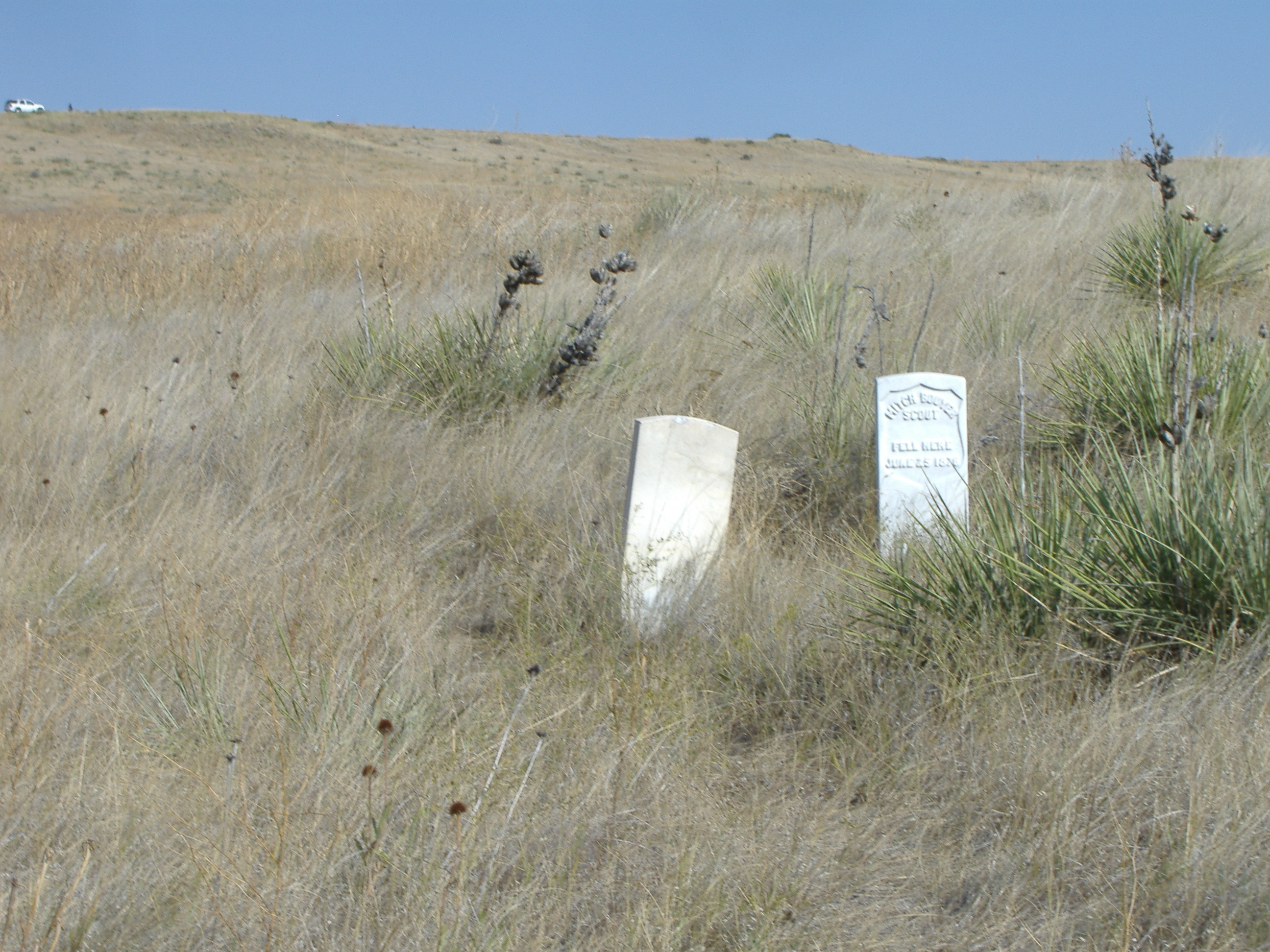
Mitch Boyer marker on Deep Ravine trail, Deep Ravine is to the right of this picture (s/sw), and about 65 yards distant.

In 1984, a fire burned through much of the Custer Battlefield, enabling archaeological digs to be made. Part of a skull was found that was identified as Boyer's by comparison of the facial bones with a misidentified photograph. The skull fragment was found to the west of the monument on Custer Hill, at what is called the 'South Skirmish Line'.

Boyer seems to have been a flamboyant character. He was wearing a piebald calf's vest the day of the fatal battle.

After Boyer's death, his widow Mary was taken in by his close friend, Thomas Leforge. When his own wife died, Leforge married Mary and adopted her children.

== See also ==
- White Swan
- Half Yellow Face
