= Half Yellow Face =

Crow leader

- Crow language: Ischu Shi Dish

Crow leader

Personal details
- Born: ca. 1830 Crow Country, Montana
- Died: ca. 1879 Crow Country, Montana
- Cause of death: killed while pursuing Sioux horse thieves
- Resting place: traditional scaffold burial in Crow Country, Montana
- Spouse: Wife
- Children: Three
- Known for: Leader of six Crow Scouts for George Armstrong Custer's 7th Cavalry; fought at the Battle of the Little Bighorn

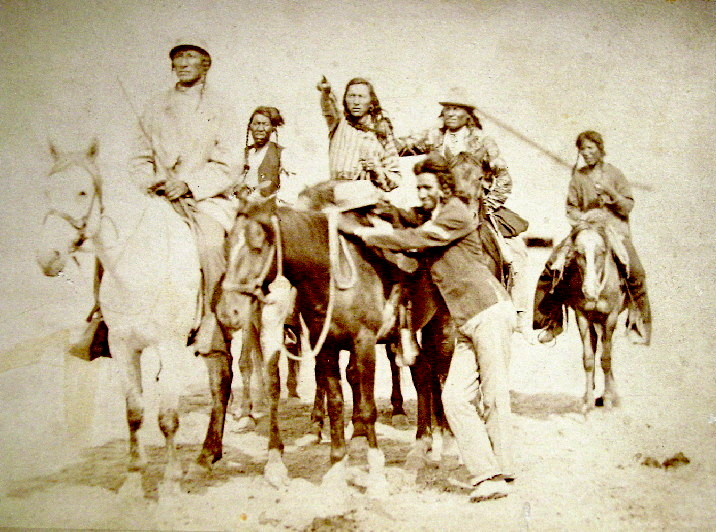
Crow Indians by D.F. Barry. This may be the only photograph of Half Yellow Face, possibly the man wearing the cavalry coat.

Half Yellow Face (or Ischu Shi Dish in the Crow language) (1830? to 1879?) was the leader of the six Crow Scouts for George Armstrong Custer's 7th Cavalry during the Great Sioux War of 1876. Half Yellow Face fought with Major Marcus Reno's troops in the Battle of the Little Bighorn. Half Yellow Face led the six Crow scouts as Custer advanced up the Rosebud Valley. The scouts entered the Little Bighorn valley on June 25, 1876 as the Battle of the Little Bighorn began. According to witnesses, before detaching from Custer's command to join Reno's, Half Yellow Face told Custer (through interpreter Mitch Boyer): "You and I are going home today by a road we do not know".

With Major Marcus Reno's troops in the Battle of the Little Bighorn, Half Yellow Face saved his friend and fellow Crow Scout White Swan, who had been severely wounded. After the battle he devised a special travois to get White Swan to the steamer Far West so he could get medical care from the Army surgeon. He continued to scout for General John Gibbon after the battle. He reputedly was killed in 1879 while pursuing Sioux horse thieves.

== Life before the Battle of the Little Big Horn ==
Half Yellow Face led a group of 11 Crow, including a young warrior called Two Leggins, on a horse stealing raid against the Shoshones. They started on foot because they hoped to return with stolen horses. They started from the area of the Yellowstone Valley, and went down into the Bighorn Basin near present-day Cody, Wyoming and then went west into the mountains. At one point they found themselves on the shores of Lake Yellowstone, after which they turned back east to re-enter the Bighorn Basin. Game was sparse, and they had little to eat but they came to four enemy tipis. Because they were weak from hunger, they risked going among the enemy's horse herd in the daylight and cut out 24 horses, which they slowly led off a distance, and then rode home to their village on the Bighorn River.

== Enlistment as a scout ==
As the 1876 campaign against the Sioux got underway General John Gibbon was ordered to march from Fort Ellis (near present-day Bozeman, Montana) and cross the Bozeman Pass and travel east down the Yellowstone River to about opposite the mouth of the Rosebud and Tongue Rivers. This was to prevent the Sioux, who were known to be on the south side of the river, from crossing to the north.

While en route down the Yellowstone River, Lieutenant Bradley, Gibbon's Chief of Scouts detoured up the Stillwater River to the site of the Crow Agency (near present-day Absarokee, Montana) and enlisted Crow scouts on April 10, 1876. The scouts enlisted for six months. One of these scouts was Half Yellow Face.

Half Yellow Face served as a scout with Gibbon's forces until June 21, 1876, at which time General Terry determined that Custer would take the 7th Cavalry and make a sortie from the Yellowstone River up Rosebud Creek with the goal of locating the Sioux/Cheyenne camp, then thought to be on upper Rosebud Creek, or in the Little Bighorn Valley. Six Crow scouts, including Half Yellow Face, were chosen to accompany Custer and the 7th Cavalry because they had hunted and traveled through this area, and were much more familiar with the country than the Arikara scouts whose home was on the Great Plains along the Missouri River, far to the east. On June 21 the scouts were detached from Gibbon's forces and reassigned to Custer and the 7th Cavalry.

== Pipe carrier and leader of the Crow scouts ==
Half Yellow Face was the "pipe carrier" or leader-chief of the six Crow Indian scouts who were assigned to General George Armstrong Custer in June, 1876. The other Crow scouts were White Swan, White Man Runs Him, Hairy Moccasin, Goes Ahead, and Curly. Half Yellow Face was the "pipe carrier" of the Crow scouts because he was older (about 40) and as a traditional Indian male, he had participated in and led more war parties in the past than the other five Crow scouts, all of whom were in their early 20s. The Army recognized Half Yellow Face's role of leader-chief of the Crow scouts by giving him the rank of corporal. He received a military coat with corporal chevrons which he wore during the remainder of his life.

== Activities before the Battle of the Little Big Horn ==
In the days before the Battle of the Little Bighorn, as Custer advanced up the Rosebud River, Custer relied on Half Yellow Face and his other Crow Scouts because they knew the country through which he was passing. Half Yellow Face usually remained with Custer while the other Crow scouts ranged over the country in front of the advancing 7th cavalry.

on June 24, the Crow scouts sent word back that the trail of the large Sioux-Cheyenne village had left the Rosebud and gone over into the Little Bighorn Valley. Custer decided to follow the track of the Indians over to the Little Bighorn rather than continue up the Rosebud. Three Crow scouts continued ahead of the troop while Half Yellow Face guided the 7th cavalry on the June 24–25 night march that took them to the Rosebud/Little Bighorn divide.

In the early morning hours of 25 June, the day of the battle, the Crow scouts had gone to a high point (the "Crows Nest") on the Rosebud-Little Bighorn divide. As dawn broke, the Crow scouts looked westward toward the valley of the Little Bighorn, a distance of about 12 to 15 miles and saw indications of morning camp fires and a large horse herd, though the lodges of the encampment were out of sight on the valley floor, behind a screening line of bluffs.

The signs seen by the Crow scouts, though indistinct, indicated a camp much larger than anticipated. After sharing this news with the other scouts, all the scouts joined in warning Custer of the risks in attacking such a large encampment, but Half Yellow Face and some other Crow scouts also told Custer that the column had been observed several times that morning by Sioux and could not remain where he was—he had to either attack or go back. Other reports of contacts or sightings of the soldiers by Sioux that morning also caused Custer concern that he had been observed. Custer feared that if he delayed an attack the encampment would be warned of his presence and scatter into many smaller units, thus avoiding the decisive military confrontation the army was seeking.

== Statement to Custer ==
Half Yellow Face is often remembered for a poetic and prophetic statement that he made to Custer on the morning of 25 June 1876, after Custer had announced his decision to attack the as yet un-assessed Sioux-Cheyenne encampment. Another Crow Scout, White Man Runs Him recalled that after Custer had heard the warnings of the Crow scouts about the large size of the encampment, but disregarded these concerns, Half Yellow Face then said to Custer (speaking through the interpreter/scout Mitch Boyer),

You and I are both going home tonight by a road we do not know.

Some historians recount the statement as being made by Bloody Knife, but that is contrary to the stated recollection of the Crow scout, White Man Runs Him, who was present.

In a 2012 book entitled Custer, Larry McMurtry has questioned this statement, on the basis that Half Yellow Face spoke no English, and Custer spoke no Crow. However, White Man Runs Him who was present, stated that Half Yellow Face spoke through the scouts' interpreter, Mitch Boyer who spoke both English and Crow since he had a Crow wife, Magpie Outside. McMurtry's earlier 1999 book acknowledged Half Yellow Face's remark, and stated that it was "probably in sign".

Whether the remark attributed to Half Yellow Face was made on the morning of June 25, 1876 through an interpreter or by sign language, two things about it are true. First, the remark, though possessing poetic power, probably made no impression on Custer who continued with his plan to divide his troops into separate units and attack the Sioux/Cheyenne encampment. Second the remark was remarkably prophetic for Custer and the five troops of cavalry who went with him.

== Actions in the battle ==
As the battle began, Half Yellow Face and another Crow scout, White Swan, went with Major Reno's detachment and took a direct and active part in the initial combat at the south end of the village on the valley floor.

White Swan was severely wounded fighting on the valley floor, and as Reno ordered his soldiers to retreat from the valley floor to a place on the bluffs just above and to the east of the river, Half Yellow Face stayed behind to assist his friend. White Swan was lying on the edge of a thicket. Half Yellow Face crawled back and got the help of an Arikara scout named Young Hawk and together they dragged White Swan into some timber. Eventually Half Yellow Face got White Swan on a horse and then led the horse through the timber and across the river and up the steep trail to the relative safety in the Reno hilltop entrenchments, arriving at about 5 p.m. This movement by Half Yellow Face and White Swan out of the valley was possible in the late afternoon because after driving Reno's troopers from the valley earlier in the afternoon, the Sioux had detected Custer and the other five troops coming toward their village from the east, and the main body of Sioux warriors left the valley to attack Custer's detachment, to protect the Sioux village from this new threat.

After getting White Swan to the hospital area in the Reno entrenchments Half Yellow Face continued to assist Reno. It was Half Yellow Face who rode south and contacted the Benteen contingent coming up from the south, in response to Custer's message directing Benteen to come to his aid bringing the ammunition packs. Half Yellow Face guided the Benteen contingent to the place where Reno had entrenched.

== After the battle ==
After engaging the 7th Cavalry in combat on June 25, and after continuing to besiege the Reno/Benteen contingent in their hilltop entrenchments on the 26th, the Sioux/Cheyenne force became aware of Gibbon advancing on them from the north, and late on the 26th they took down their village and went south up the valley of the Little Bighorn River. On the 27th after the Sioux had left, Half Yellow Face made a special travois and moved the wounded Crow Scout White Swan twelve miles down the valley to the "Far West" steamship so that White Swan got medical care with other wounded soldiers in a temporary hospital near the mouth of the Big Horn River.

Half Yellow Face and another Crow scout, Curly, dutifully stayed with Gibbon's forces on the Yellowstone until furloughed to visit their Crow village which was camped on Pryor Creek, though the three other Crow scouts, White Man Runs Him, Hairy Moccasin and Goes Ahead had simply left the Reno entrenchments at about 4:45 on June 25, the day of the main battle, and went back to their Crow village. These Crow scouts abandoned the Reno entrenchments before Half Yellow Face and the wounded White Swan had come across the river and up the bluffs, and they were unaware that White Swan and Half Yellow Face had survived the fight in the valley. Thus, the scouts who returned to the village early reported that White Swan and Half Yellow Face were dead. This mistake was only corrected when the Crow scouts remaining with Gibbon were given permission to go back to their village on Pryor Creek.

== Death, burial and legacy ==
In 1877, Lt. General Philip H. Sheridan commanding the Military Division of the Missouri sent his brother, Lt. Col. Michael V. Sheridan to the battlefield, to re-inter the bodies of the enlisted men, and to bring back the remains of certain officers. Lt. Col. Michael Sheridan visited the battlefield on July 2, 1877, seeking "some intelligible account of the massacre". Although Half Yellow Face accompanied Col. Sheridan on his 1877 tour of the battlefield, Col Sheridan remarked he was not helpful, as he had been with Reno's contingent.

Traditional Crow sources indicate that Half Yellow Face died in 1879, three years after the battle. He continued in the traditional role of a Crow warrior, and Indian oral reports state he was killed on the Yellowstone River while pursuing a Sioux raiding party who had stolen Crow horses. The 1885 Census records confirm that Half Yellow Face had died leaving his wife Can't Get Up and 3 children.

== See also ==
- Great Sioux War of 1876
- Crow Nation
