= Hairy Moccasin =

Crow scout

- Esh-sup-pee-me-shish
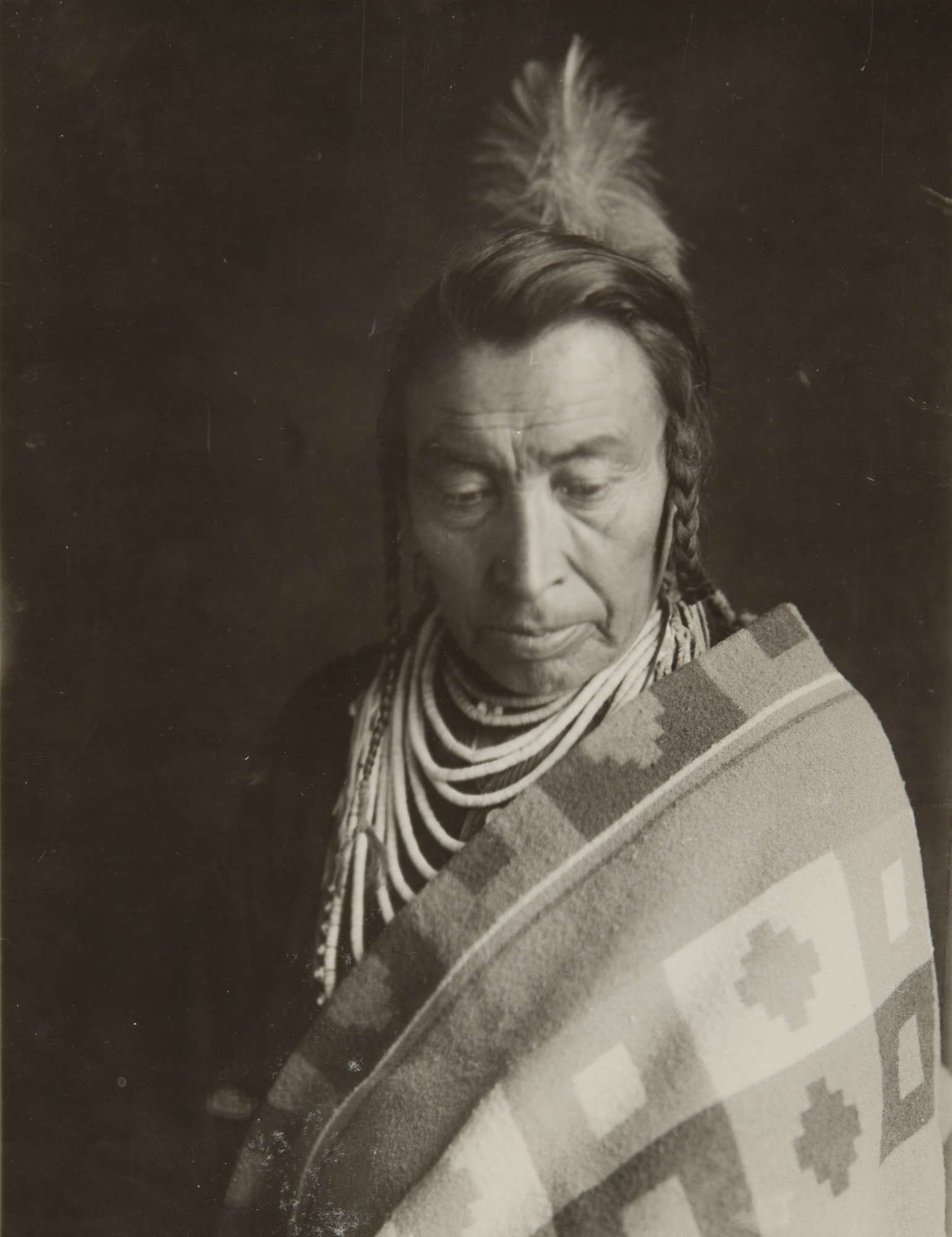
- Hairy Moccasin, c. 1910
- Born: c. 1854
- Died: October 9, 1922; Lodge Grass, Montana
- Military career
- Allegiance: Crow people
- Service years: 1876–1877
- Rank: Scout
- Unit: 7th Cavalry
- Conflicts: Battle of the Little Bighorn: Black Hills War

Hairy Moccasin (also known as Esh-sup-pee-me-shish) (c. 1854 – October 9, 1922) was a Crow scout for George Armstrong Custer's 7th Cavalry during the 1876 campaign against the Sioux and Northern Cheyenne. He was a survivor of the Battle of the Little Big Horn.

He volunteered to become an Army scout on April 10, 1876, and joined fellow Crow warriors White Man Runs Him, Curly, Goes Ahead, White Swan, and Half Yellow Face (leader of the Crow scouts) in the valley of the Little Big Horn River near the current site of Crow Agency, Montana to assist the Army's fight against the Sioux and Northern Cheyenne. Both tribes were traditional enemies of the Crow.

After scouting the encampment on the banks of the Little Big Horn River, they reported to Custer. After Custer got angry at his changing into traditional Crow clothing for the battle believing he was going to die, Hairy Moccasin was dismissed by Custer about an hour before the last stand. He joined Strikes the Bear (an Arikara Scout), White Man Runs Him, and Goes Ahead with Major Marcus Reno's column on the ridge overlooking the last stand. Attacked but not overrun, most of Reno's men survived the engagement.

After the Black Hills War ended, Hairy Moccasin settled onto the Crow Reservation in Montana. He died October 9, 1922, near Lodge Grass and was buried in Saint Ann's Cemetery.

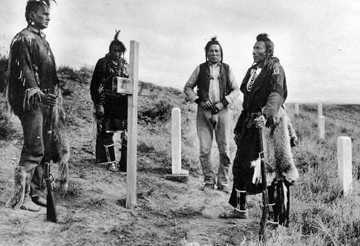
Former Crow scouts at the Custer battlefield around 1913. From left to right; White Man Runs Him, Hairy Moccasin, Curly and Goes Ahead.

== See also ==
- White Swan
- Half Yellow Face
