= The Force (disambiguation) =

The Force is a metaphysical power in the Star Wars fictional universe.

The Force may also refer to:

== Television and film ==
- The Force (film), American documentary
- The Force (advertisement), 2011 television advertisement for Volkswagen "Passat" model
- The Force (2009 TV series), British television series on Channel 4
- The Force: Behind the Line, 2006 Australian documentary television series
- The Force: Essex, British television programme documenting (since 2000) the work of Essex Police

== Music ==
- The Force (Kool & the Gang album), 1977
- The FORCE, 2024 LL Cool J album
- The Force (Onslaught album), 1986

== Other uses ==
- Police force, the local law enforcement body
- Western Force, a rugby union team from Perth, Australia
- "The Force", nickname of snooker player Peter Ebdon

== See also ==
- Force (disambiguation)
- May the Force be with you (disambiguation)
