= White Swan =

Native American who served in the U.S. Army

- Crow language: Mee-nah-tsee-us
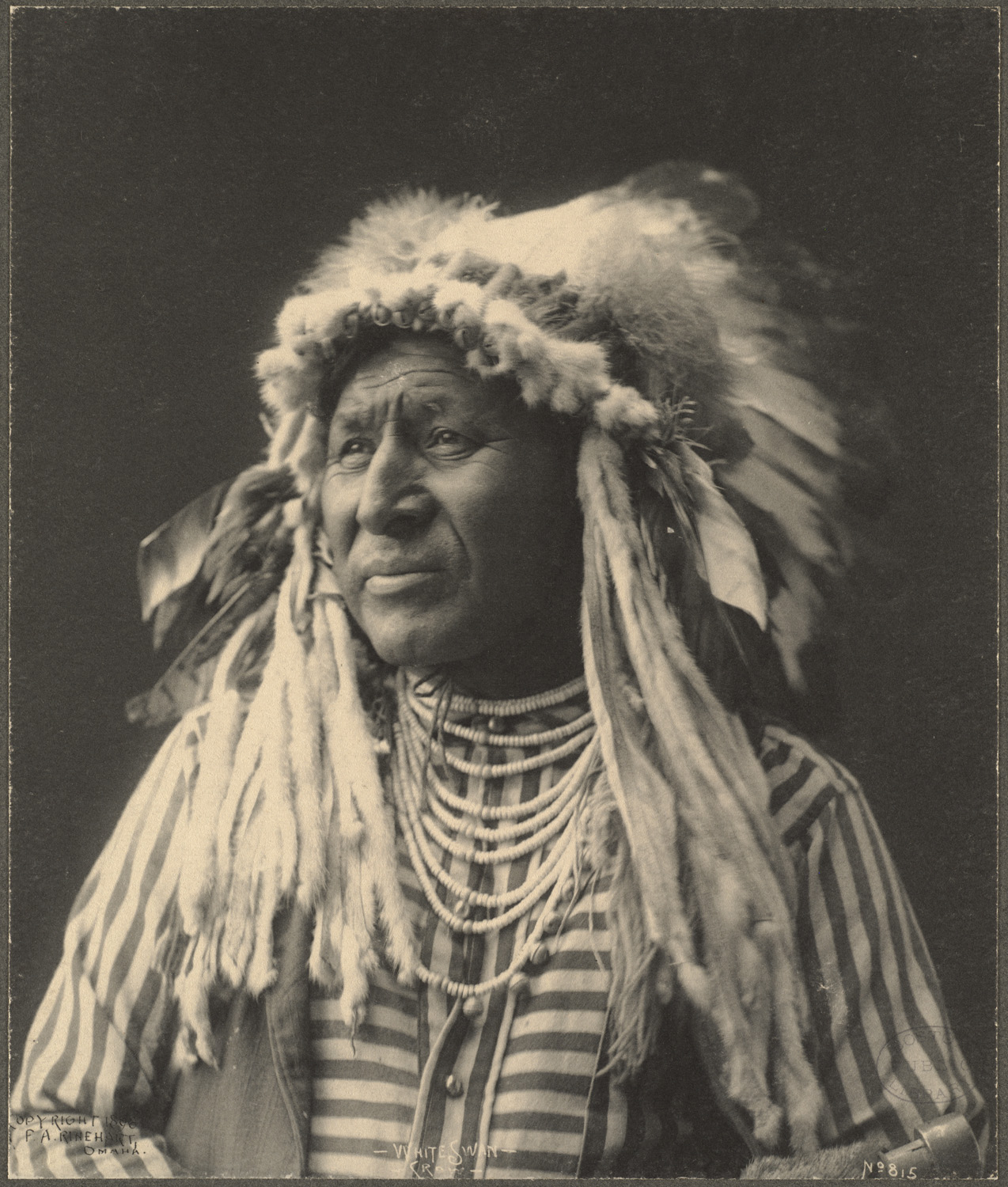
- White Swan, photo by Frank Rinehart

Crow leader

Personal details
- Born: c.1850
- Died: August 12, 1904
- Resting place: Little Bighorn National Cemetery
- Spouse(s): A wife, who died when White Swan was 23
- Relations: An aunt, "Strikes By The Side Of The Water"; a cousin, Curly (sometimes referred to as his brother, according to Crow custom)
- Known for: One of six Crow Scouts for George Armstrong Custer's 7th Cavalry Regiment; fought at the Battle of the Little Bighorn; artist in later life
- Nickname(s): "Strikes Enemy", "White Goose"

White Swan (c.1850—1904), or Mee-nah-tsee-us in the Crow language, was one of six Crow Scouts for George Armstrong Custer's 7th Cavalry Regiment during the 1876 campaign against the Sioux and Northern Cheyenne. At the Battle of the Little Bighorn in the Crow Indian Reservation, White Swan went with Major Reno's detachment, and fought alongside the soldiers at the south end of the village. Of the six Crow scouts at the Battle of the Little Bighorn, White Swan stands out because he aggressively sought combat with multiple Sioux and Cheyenne warriors, and he was the only Crow Scout to be wounded in action, suffering severe wounds to his hand/wrist and leg/foot. After being disabled by his wounds, he was taken to Reno's hill entrenchments by Half Yellow Face, the pipe-bearer (leader) of the Crow scouts, which no doubt saved his life.

On the 27th, after the battle, Half Yellow Face made a special horse travois for White Swan and moved him down the Little Horn valley to the Far West steamship, moored at the junction of the Bighorn River and the Little Horn, so he could get medical care from army physicians. White Swan was treated in a temporary Army hospital at the junction of the Bighorn and Yellowstone rivers. At the Crow encampments on Pryor Creek, other returning scouts reported that White Swan had died, but he survived his wounds.

Following the Battle of the Little Bighorn, White Swan continued for five years (1876 to 1881) to serve as a scout with the U.S. Army, though he was disabled from wounds received in the battle, including a severely deformed right wrist and hand, and a wound in his foot/leg which caused him to limp. In photographs, White Swan also had a scar on his forehead where he had been struck with a war club in a separate battle with a Sioux warrior. Either from this blow or from other sources, White Swan could not hear and thus was unable to speak in his later life. Eventually, he was awarded a small army pension.

In White Swan's later life, he lived at the Crow Agency, after it had been moved in 1884 to its present site in the Little Bighorn valley in Montana, close to the site of the battlefield. When he could no longer be an Army scout, White Swan began to produce drawings that represented key events in his life, including events of the Battle of the Little Bighorn. These drawings were bought by visitors to the Crow Agency and the nearby Custer Battlefield, providing White Swan with a welcome source of income. These drawings have now been discovered by collectors and their artistic value has been recognized. They have recently become the subject of collectors, exhibitions, books and university theses, and prints of his drawings are now commercially produced.

While living at Crow Agency, White Swan was painted by the artist J.H. Sharp, who knew him and described him as "Jolly, good natured and a general favorite." White Swan was also photographed by Frank Rinehart, and by William A. Petzolt, producing photos included in this article. White Swan's wife had died when he was only 23 before he became an army scout, and he did not remarry. He lived for a time with an aunt, "Strikes By The Side Of The Water" who was also the mother of Curly, another Crow scout, and he and Curly were known in the Crow Agency community as brothers, though their personalities were said to be the opposite of each other.

He died in 1904, leaving no direct descendants. He is buried in the National Cemetery at the Little Bighorn Battlefield at a location described below. Although his early death and his inability to hear and speak left him out of the limelight that later fell on the other surviving Crow scouts, his outstanding bravery during the battle and his artistic ability established an enduring legacy.

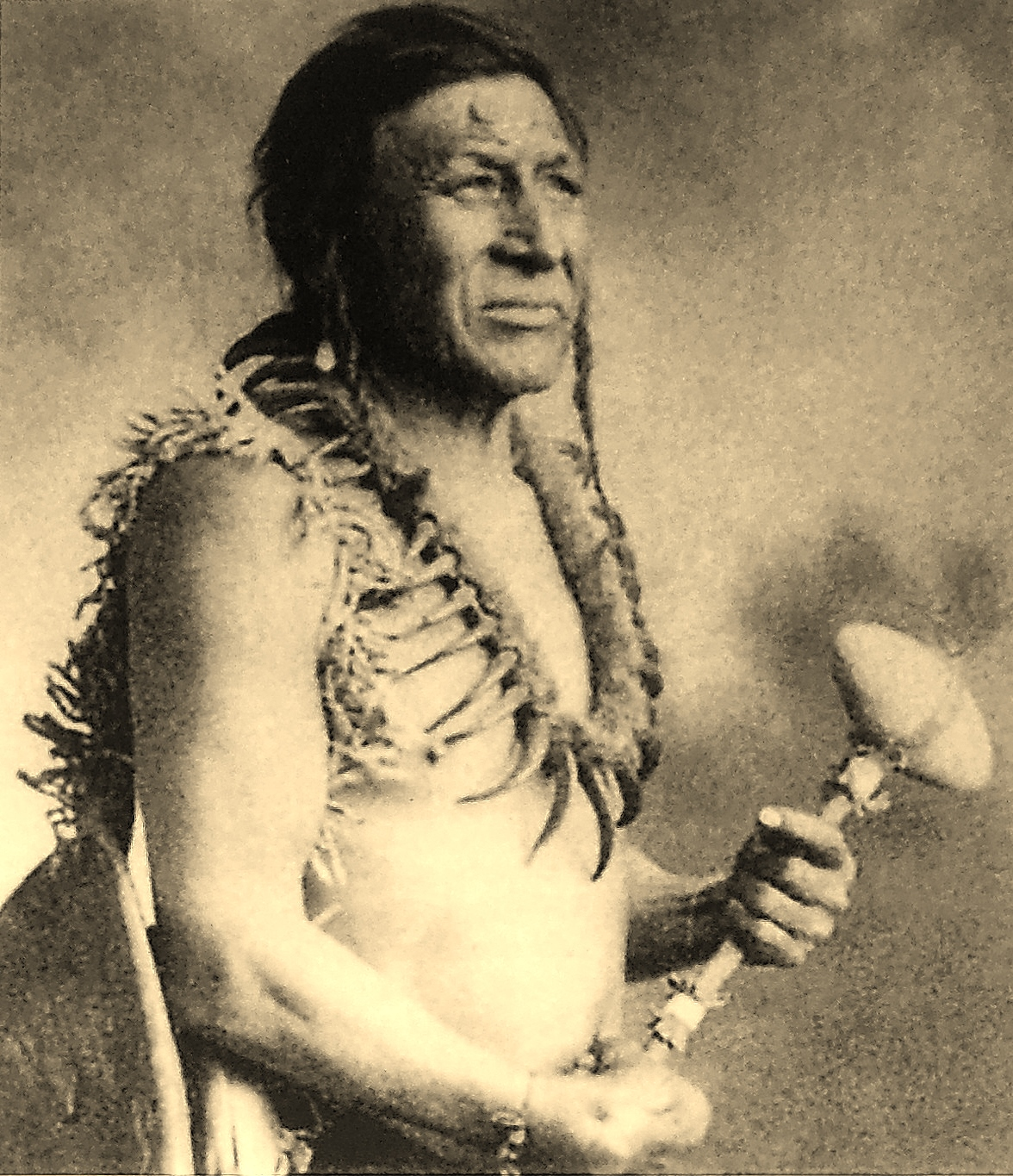
White Swan, photo by William A. Petzoldt. This photo shows White Swan's battle scars, including a) the disabling injury to his right wrist received at the Battle of the Little Bighorn, b) scar on his forehead from an individual and separate encounter with a Sioux warrior.

== Biography ==
=== Early life, names ===
White Swan was born in approximately 1851 though some sources state his birth date was in 1850 or 1852. He had been raised in the traditional manner of his tribe, and would have acquired warrior status in his early teens through deeds of bravery.

White Swan married, but his wife died in 1873, before his enlistment as an army scout. He never remarried.

In historical references White Swan is also referred as "Strikes Enemy" and "White Goose" or Mee-nah-te-hash in the Crow language.

=== Army service as a Crow scout in the Great Sioux War of 1876 ===
==== Background of the Great Sioux War ====
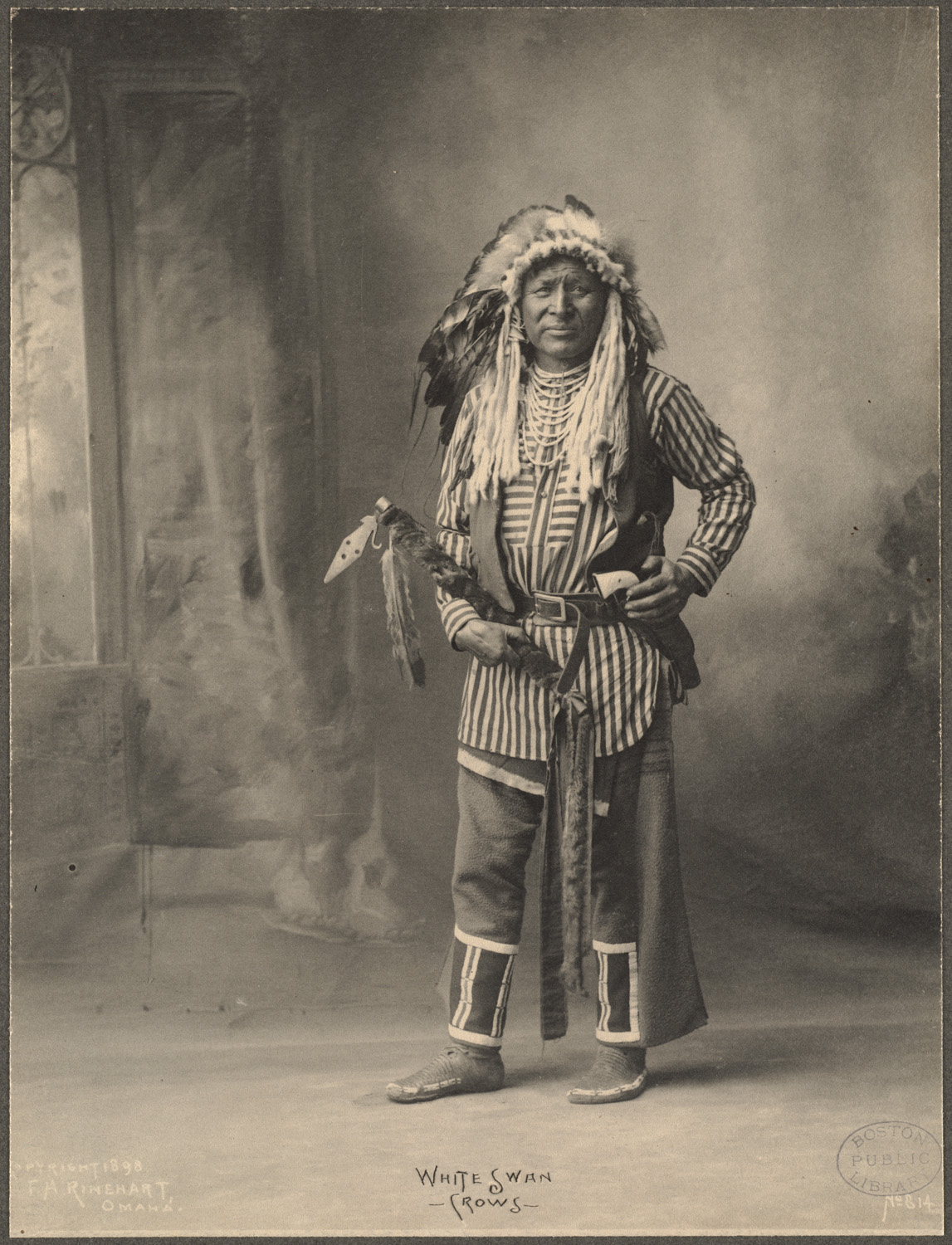
White Swan, photo by Frank Rinehart. This photo shows White Swan's tomahawk, now in the National Museum of the American Indian, as an example of artistic expression in a weapon with spiritual or symbolic significance White Swans's battle scar to his right wrist may also be seen.

From 1870, the Crows had complained about hostile Lakotas encroaching from the east on Crow Indian reservation lands. The Crows requested that the U.S. Army take actions against these Sioux trespassers. From the point of view of the Crow Tribe, in 1876 finally something was going to be done.

However the Great Sioux War of 1876 that engulfed the life of White Swan, started because the U.S. Government also had its own larger agenda. Gold had been found in 1873 in the Black Hills on reservation lands granted the Sioux tribe by the Treaty of Fort Laramie (1868). The gold strike had been made public in 1874 and by 1875 a full scale gold rush was underway. Motivated by growing unemployment caused by the Panic of 1873 ever-increasing numbers of gold seekers poured the Black Hills, establishing mining centers and boom towns. Being on the Sioux Reservation, these towns and mines were completely outside the usual framework of laws and jurisdictions for U.S. Territories, which generated chaotic conditions resulting in, among other things, no reliable base of organized law enforcement owing to the absence of federal law jurisdiction, as well as no federal marshals, courts or judges. Another important factor was the economic impact of the panic of 1873 which had left workers unemployed and the dollar devalued by a return to a de facto gold standard, augmenting a national priority for continued and increasing production from gold mines in the Black Hills.

The U.S. Government had tried unsuccessfully in 1875 to bring the Sioux living on the reservations to a conference to consider modifying the 1868 Fort Laramie Treaty by the U.S. repurchasing the Black Hills back from the tribe. However in Article XII of that treaty any modification of treaty lands required the agreement of 3/4 of the tribe's adult males, and there were large bands of "off-reservation" Sioux (including influential leaders Sitting Bull, Crazy Horse, Crow King, Rain in the Face, Gall and many others) who did not reside on the reservations and who also did not want to cede the Black Hills back to federal control. These bands lived year round in their traditional migratory way on the huge hunting preserve in the “unceded Indian Territory” in Wyoming, Nebraska and South Dakota given the Sioux by Article XVI of the Treaty of Fort Laramie (1868) which included the vast area extending westward from the Black Hills across the entire Powder River Basin to the crest of the Big Horn Mountains. In the fall 1875, the U.S. Government gave up on fair or equitable methods and sent out messengers to each band with an impossible ultimatum — to leave their winter camps in the hunting preserve and immediately return to their agencies in the Dakota Territories by January 31, 1876. When this predictably did not occur, as deep winter restricted travel of migratory bands, in February 1876 the Government directed army columns to converge from the south, east and west on these "off-reservation" Sioux bands in their remote encampments, with orders to bring them back to their agencies, by force if necessary.

=== Enlistment with the 7th Infantry, early skirmishes ===
One such military column commanded by Col. John Gibbon was instructed to proceed from Ft. Ellis, near present day Bozeman, Montana, and march eastward, down the Yellowstone River and take up a position in southern Montana Territory to block the "off reservation" Sioux from crossing north of the Yellowstone River. In furtherance of this mission, on April 9, 1876, Col. John Gibbon went with Lt. James Bradley to the Crow Indian Agency, which was then located on the Stillwater River Drainage in Montana, to recruit Indian scouts. In an embarrassing two-hour council the chiefs of the Mountain Crows expressed their reluctance to help the expedition. They pointed out that Indian warriors traveled light and fast and struck quickly, whereas the soldiers marched slowly with wagons and thus never found the enemy.

Fortunately for Gibbon, the young Crow braves did not follow the elders' advice, and sought adventure. On April 10, 1876, some twenty five Crows were enlisted for six months in the 7th Infantry by Lt. James Bradley, chief of scouts, including White Swan and Half Yellow Face. On April 13, 1876, the Crow Scouts went with Gibbon's 7th Infantry force of 477 persons, as they marched down the north side of the Yellowstone, arriving opposite mouth of the Bighorn River on April 20. Gibbon then moved eastward again along the north bank of the Yellowstone to a camp opposite the mouth Rosebud Creek. The Crow Scouts ranged across (south) south of the Yellowstone, and located the main Sioux village in the process of moving from Tongue River valley to the Rosebud valley in May 1876. In the course of this move, the Crow scouts skirmished with Sioux scouts.

Meanwhile, General Alfred Terry's column was marching east from Fort Lincoln, in the Dakota territory, and Terry rendezvoused with Col. Gibbon's column opposite the mouth of Rosebud Creek on June 21, 1876. General Terry's command included the 7th Cavalry under General George A. Custer.

==== Scouting activities with Custer's 7th Cavalry leading up to the Battle of the Little Bighorn ====
On June 21, White Swan was detached from the 7th Infantry to go with the 7th Cavalry, along with five other Crow Scouts who were Half Yellow Face (leader of the Crow Scouts), White Man Runs Him, Goes Ahead, Hairy Moccasin, and Curley. The 7th Cavalry, under the command of Lt. Col. George Armstrong Custer, was ordered by General Terry to follow the trail of the large encampment of "off-reservation" Sioux who lived nomadic lives off the Great Sioux Reservation in present South Dakota. This group was making an annual westward spring migration from their camp on the Powder River valley to the Tongue and then to the Rosebud Valley, and on to the Little Bighorn. Custer was ordered to locate the encampment of these "off-reservation" Sioux on the Rosebud Creek, or in the adjacent Little Bighorn Valley, around 20 miles (30 km) inside the eastern border of the Crow Indian reservation.

The six Crow Scouts shared duties with 26 Arikara (Ree) Scouts, under a Chief of Scouts Lt Charles A. Varnum,. However, the Crow scouts knew the Rosebud country much better than the Arikara because this had been traditional Crow country for centuries. As far back as 1805 records indicated that fur trader Francois-Antoine Larocque had camped with a band of Crows in what was later determined to be Little Bighorn River. The Fort Laramie Treaty of 1851 gave the Crows a large reservation running west from the Powder River that including the river drainages of the Tongue, the Rosebud, and the Little Bighorn river valleys. The repeated aggressive westward incursions of Sioux bands beyond the Powder River in the 1850s and 1860s led to another treaty, the later 1868 Crow Treaty of Fort Laramie, which established a new western boundary for the Sioux/Crow reservations at the 107 Meridian, which ran north-south and generally separated the Rosebud drainage on the east from the Little Bighorn (aka Greasy Grass) drainage on the west. This boundary area was a sort of no-man's land with both Sioux and Crows hunting on it, and warriors from both tribes crossing it to raid and steal horses from each other.

The six Crow scouts joined Custer on June 21. "They are magnificent-looking men, so much handsomer and more Indian-like than any we have ever seen, and so jolly and sportive ... " wrote Custer to his wife, Elizabeth B. Custer. He also pointed out why it was important to get them connected to the U.S. Army, "I now have some Crow scouts with me, as they are familiar with the country." Charles A. Varnum spelled it out in his reminiscences, "These Crows were in their own country."

Since this was their ancestral homeland, the Crow scouts were relied on to undertake important scouting assignments for Custer in the days after June 21 leading up to the Battle of the Little Bighorn on June 25.

When Custer struck the trail of the "off-reservation" Sioux, the scouts' count of 400 to 450 lodges in the encampment confirmed army sources of an "off-reservation" nomadic group of about 800 warriors. This compared favorably to Custer's force of about 600 troopers. However this initial assessment on June 21 was made on encampments dating back to May 21, when the Sioux/Cheyenne crossed from the Tongue River to the Rosebud Valley. As the scouts followed this trail up the Rosebud, past Lame Deer Creek and then on to the divide with the Little Horn Valley, they found the older trail increasingly joined and overlaid by many newer trails. These newer trails were left by many other bands of Sioux/Cheyenne coming from the reservations to join the original "off-reservation" Sioux for their yearly summer gathering. Although it was not appreciated at the time, these late arriving bands of Sioux/Cheyenne swelled the encampment from 400 to about 960 lodges, able to field close to 2000 warriors.

Custer's prior experience in pursuing other Indian bands indicated that an Indian group would scatter if they knew they were being pursued. Custer used the Crows to check these trails to rule out a dispersal of the encampment he was following. Custer tended to disregard the Crow scouts' intelligence that more and more Indians were gathering together.

On the early morning of June 25, 1876, White Swan and other Crow Scouts ascended a high point on the divide between the Little Bighorn River and Rosebud Creek. From this lookout point (which later became known as the "Crow's Nest") the scouts saw very large horse herds on the western margins of the Little Bighorn Valley, some 15 air miles away. These large horse herds indicated an unexpectedly large Sioux/Cheyenne encampment. The encampment itself was out of sight on the valley floor.

The Crow scouts questioned the wisdom of attacking such a large encampment. However, Custer was focused on his concern that his force had been detected that morning by Sioux scouts, and he feared that if he did not attack at once, the large encampment would break up into many smaller bands which would scatter in all directions, thus escaping and avoiding the decisive engagement the army hoped for. Custer accordingly made plans for an immediate attack, and as he proceeded down Reno Creek toward the Little Bighorn Valley, he created four separate detachments, intended to prevent the encampment from scattering, and to strike the village from different directions. Reno with three troops would attack the south end of the village. Custer with five troops would attack the north end of the village, and Benteen with three troops would scout briefly to the south and then join the battle to assist the other detachments; Lt. McDougall's remaining troop would act as rear guard protecting the pack train.

==== Wounded in action at the Battle of the Little Bighorn ====
As the Battle of the Little Bighorn unfolded, White Swan and the chief Crow Scout Half Yellow Face, along with Arikara scouts accompanied the detachment under Major Reno. The Indian scouts were told to stampede the horse herd on the western margins of the camp. Reno's detachment charged the south end of the village as ordered, but as warriors poured out to defend the village Reno ordered the troops to dismount and form a skirmish line. This outpouring of Sioux warriors frustrated the plan of the scouts to stampede the horse herd, and the scouts, including White Swan and Half Yellow Face, began to fight alongside the cavalrymen. They were soon engaged in furious combat with swiftly increasing numbers of Sioux and Cheyenne warriors. At one time, White Swan was faced by six warriors.

As more warriors swarmed out of the village, Reno's detachment pulled back into a patch of nearby timber along the river. After taking more losses in the timber, Reno ordered a retreat out of the timber and across the river and up onto the bluffs on the east side of the valley. By the time Reno had ordered the retreat across the river, White Swan had suffered severe bullet wounds in the right hand or wrist and in the foot, knee or leg (reports differ), and also could not hear, either from being hit on the head with a war club or because a rifle was fired close to his ear (reports differ).

The soldiers' retreat from the timber disintegrated into a rout, and the Sioux closed in on the now disorganized mass of retreating troopers, killing the stragglers and the disabled. Back in the timber, Half Yellow Face got the wounded White Swan on a horse and shielded by the timber, waited until the mass of Sioux warriors had turned their attention to Custer's column, now approaching the north end of the village, after which Yellow Face led the horse across the river and up the bluffs to the location where the Reno detachment was digging in, and where they were later reinforced by the other detachments under Captain Benteen and Lieutenant McDougall. This action by Half Yellow Face probably saved White Swan's life. Troopers with Reno later recounted how White Swan, though wounded, wanted to continue fighting, and disabled though he was, tried to crawl back to the firing lines.

After Reno's men fled across the river, the now thoroughly aroused and mobilized Sioux and Cheyenne drew back, and then launched a fresh attack to the north on Custer's separate detachment of five companies (about 210 men) who were now firing into the north end of the village. At this point the Sioux outnumbered Custer's men by about 8 to 1. Custer's detachment was first driven back to a low ridge east of the valley, and then overwhelmed and killed to the last man. This intense engagement lasted about an hour during the afternoon of June 25, 1876, after which the warriors returned to press the attack on Reno's entrenched position on the bluffs. The next day, June 26, the Sioux continued the attack on the beleaguered Reno contingent, where White Swan lay in the section for the wounded. However, Sioux scouts reported the approach from the north of the large army column under Generals Terry and Gibbon. In the late afternoon and evening, the Sioux and Cheyenne ended their siege of Reno and Benteen and hastily broke camp and withdrew south, up the Little Bighorn Valley.

==== Medical care following the battle, disability ====
The next day, June 27, 1876, Half Yellow Face made a horse travois designed to carry the wounded White Swan in a sitting position, and used this to carry him about 12 miles from the battle site to the steamer Far West on the Bighorn River so White Swan could get more medical care. White Swan was carried on the Far West about 40 to 50 river miles down the Bighorn to the Yellowstone, where he was left in a temporary hospital facility with some of the less seriously wounded soldiers.

Almost immediately after the battle, the three scouts White Man Runs Him, Goes Ahead and Hairy Moccasin left for the main Crow encampment which was "two sleeps" away on the mouth of Pryor Creek, and Gibbon's other Crow scouts went with them. At the village they reported that both White Swan and Half Yellow Face had been killed.

Curly and Half Yellow Face had not gone with the other scouts to the Crow Village and had returned with Gibbon to the mouth of the Big Horn, where White Swan was in the temporary army hospital. On July 4, Col. Gibbon gave Curly and Half Yellow Face leave but kept White Swan in the hospital so that he could continue to get medical treatment and recover.

White Swan was sufficiently badly wounded that his recovery was delayed. When he finally returned to his relatives and friends at the Crow village, they said it was like having the dead return. Records show that White Swan was discharged from Army scout duty in September 1876, but reenlisted in the Army for scouting activities in November 1877, through it is unlikely his wounds were healed by this time. He continued a recovery from his wounds but suffered disabilities from them for the rest of his life.

=== Later life, after the Battle of the Little Bighorn ===
Although disabled, White Swan managed to remain an Army scout for much of the remaining five years (1876-1881) following the Battle of the Little Bighorn. When the Crow Reservation was further limited in size, the Agency was moved in 1884 from the site of present-day Absorakee, Montana on the Stillwater River to its present location at present-day Crow Agency in the Little Bighorn Valley, very close to the site of the battle. White Swan also moved to the new agency site.

White Swan continued to be limited by his battle wounds. White Swan had lost the lower half of his right hand, and he had a right wrist that was permanently deformed to bend sharply inward. (See photo above taken from the right side, showing injured wrist). He also limped from the bullet wound in his leg and/or foot. He was deaf and dumb, reportedly from a blow to his forehead by a war club in a battle with a Sioux warrior, probably at a time different than the Little Bighorn Battle.

J.H. Sharp, the noted western painter, came to know White Swan while he was living at Crow Agency, Montana and painting the Crow people. Sharp painted White Swan. He made this note to accompany the painting.

Reno's scout in Custer battle, wounded many times, picked up in battlefield two days later -- deaf and dumb from stroke of war club in forehead. A good artist in Indian picture-writing. Jolly, good natured and a general favorite. A full brother, and direct opposite in character of 'Curley', Custer's scout."

Although White Swan was quite limited in speech, probably owing to his deafness, he could still communicate by using the sign language of the Plains Indians.

Statements from White Swan's army pension file indicate that his wife had died in 1873, before he enlisted as an Army scout, and he never remarried. The 1885 Census recorded him as living with a widowed aunt named "Strikes By The Side Of The Water". This aunt was the mother of Curley, another Crow Scout, which would make White Swan and Curley cousins, though the artist, J.H. Sharp knew White Swan as the brother of Curley.

In 1894 White Swan was crippled and unable to hear or speak. In 1897 he applied for and received a pension of $17.00 a month for his military services. The 1900 census lists White Swan as "widowed" and the only member of his household. White Swan's only other relative was Sage Woman, a half sister on his father's side, which meant she was from another Crow tribal clan than White Swan, since clan relations are passed down through mothers. These facts indicate that White Swan lived in a more isolated fashion than he would have otherwise done, had he had a larger base of Crow relatives, either by blood or by clan. He died leaving no direct descendants and there were no indication of adoptive children, further indicating a limited group of close Crow relatives, by blood or clan, unusual in the Crow culture.

=== Artistic abilities ===
White Swan was known for his artistic abilities. While living at the Crow Agency in the Little Bighorn valley, he made drawings to illustrate key events in his life, including his role in the Battle of the Little Bighorn. At least fifteen drawings have been attributed to White Swan, and others may remain to be discovered. Though not signed, his drawings can be identified by the many scenes they share and by similarities in style with the few for which his authorship is definitely established.

In addition to his separate drawings, sources indicate that White Swan, though disabled, created drawings and paintings on pages from accounting ledgers to depict his role in the famous battle. White Swan also drew and painted on larger sheets of muslin canvas, showing multiple deeds from his life.

In White Swan's later recollection of the Battle of the Little Big Horn, before the battle started he watched the Lakota camp through a handheld telescope with his warhorse standing close by - this recollection would later become a favorite scene of the artist White Swan to illustrate his role in the battle.

Over the years since White Swan died, his artistic abilities have been recognized and his drawings have been collected. White Swan has emerged in Crow history as a talented artist. White Swan would have needed income after he had ceased to be an army scout and living at Crow Agency, just a few miles from the site of the famous battle, he found a ready market for this art. The battlefield drew visitors, and to a lesser extent so did the Crow Agency. These visitors included military men, government employees and other persons interested in the history of the famous battle, or simply interested in the Crow culture. Though White Swan could not serve as a guide or interpreter for visitors of the battle field as the other scouts did, owing to his speech impediment, his art allowed him to provide something unique to visitors who wanted to return home with an illustration that genuinely represented their encounter with Indians of the West. White Swan's art showing his war deeds ideally captured the essence of the Indian warrior tradition based on heroic acts.

In addition to his drawings, White Swan's craftsmanship appears in his personal items, particularly his tomahawk, pictured (a) in the photo above (which may be enlarged) and (b) further shown and described at this footnoted web source. A tomahawk in the Northern Plains warrior culture could evolve from being a weapon to an item carried primarily to count coup, which transformed the item into one possessing spiritual significance. Adornments to White Swan's tomahawk (see item pictured in footnoted source, or in the photo above), probably indicated brave war deeds, and/or instructions of critical spiritual import, received through visions or through the intervention of a spiritual leader/mentor (a "medicine man").

When living at Crow Agency on the Little Bighorn river, White Swan had a tepee which had drawings around the lower portion that depicted the Custer battle. A picture of the tepee is at the footnoted citation.

In his later life, White Swan was photographed by Frank Rinehart and by William A. Petzolt. See photos provided above.

White Swan's tomahawk and his drawings remain today as a legacy of his time. White Swan's art is now drawing increasing attention from collectors, and they have been the subject of exhibits, and the subject of University thesis. and collections. Some of White Swan's works were collected as part of the Paul Dyck collection of Plains Indians art and artifacts, and are now part of the collection at the Buffalo Bill Historical Center in Cody, Wyoming.

=== Death and burial ===
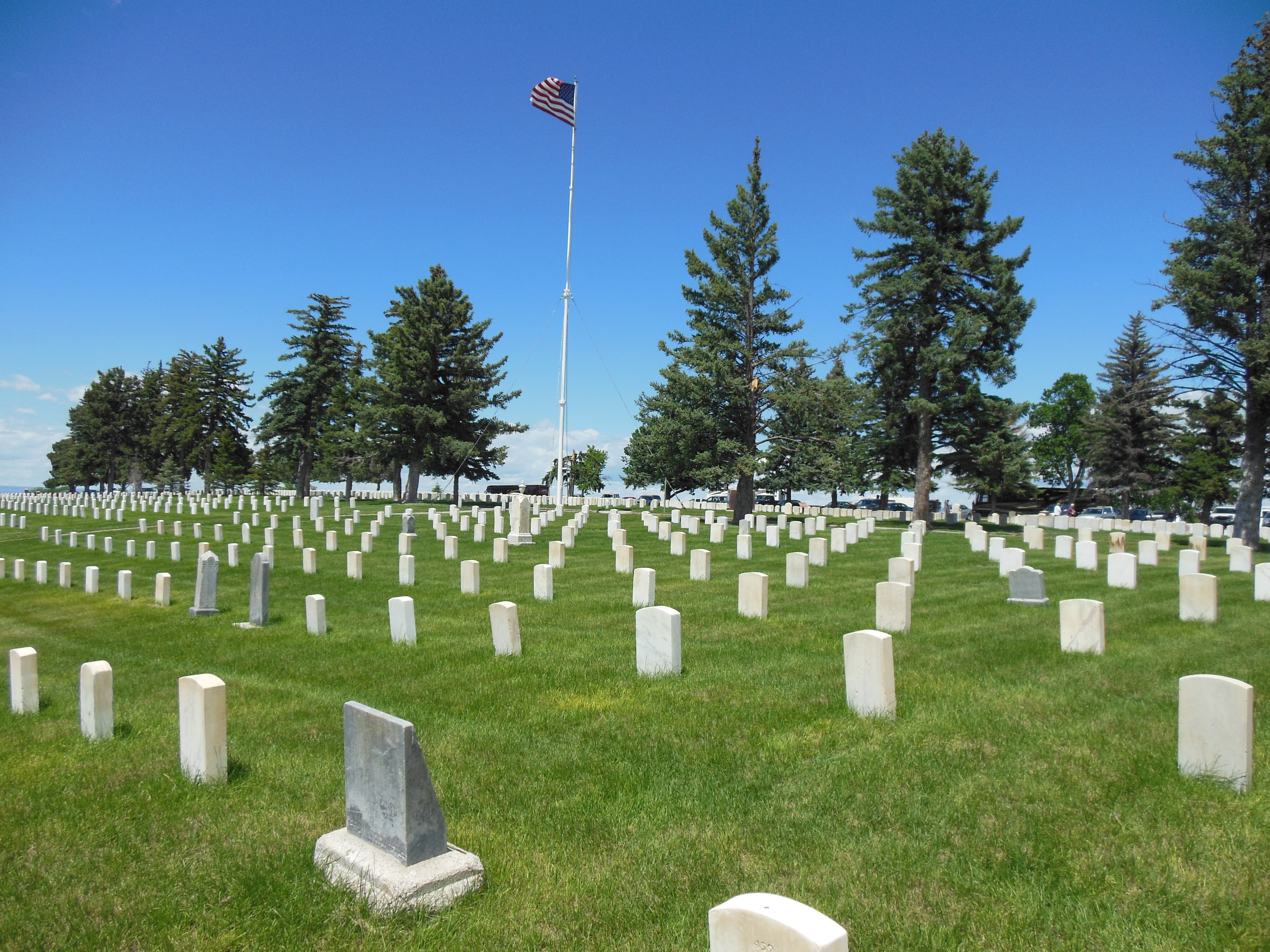
This photo is looking due north from White Swans' (Crow scout and artist) grave marker (the gray marker in the immediate left foreground) to the central flagpole at the National Cemetery at the Little Bighorn Battlefield. There has been some debate that White Swans headstone could not be found in the National Cemetery. It is in section A, Grave 460. Go to the flagpole and walk due south, and you will come to the grave marker.

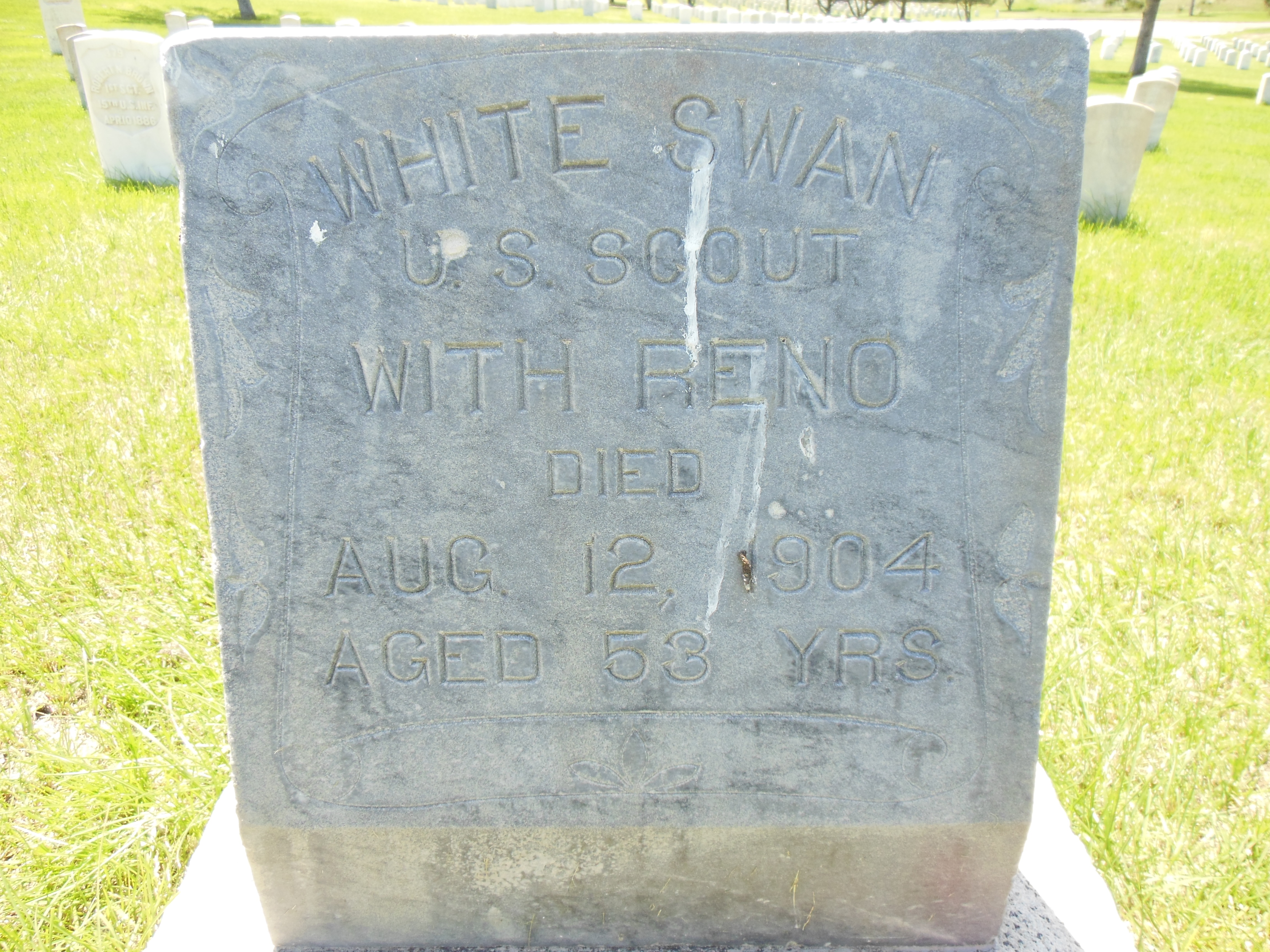
Face of White Swan's grave marker at the Little Bighorn Battlefield National Cemetery

White Swan died on August 12, 1904, at the age of 53 or 54. Having never remarried after the death of his wife when he was 23, White Swan left no direct descendants to carry on his name or his legacy. White Swan was buried at the Little Bighorn National Cemetery in the section set apart for veterans. See the photos which indicate his grave marker and his grave site.

== Places or things named after White Swan ==
The White Swan Memorial Library at the Little Bighorn Battlefield National Monument also houses the office of the park historian, and is located in the historic stone house (the original superintendent's headquarters). According to the National Park Service, this facility contains the finest collection of research materials available on the battle of the Little Bighorn, as well as other related historical events. Visits to the library and to the park historian are by appointment.

== See also ==
- Half Yellow Face
- White Man Runs Him
- Hairy Moccasin
- Goes Ahead
- Curley
- George Armstrong Custer
- Marcus A. Reno
- Battle of Little Bighorn
- Great Sioux War of 1876
- Crow Tribe
