= May the Force be with you (disambiguation) =

"May the Force be with you" is an iconic expression from the Star Wars movies.

May the Force be with you may also refer to:

- "May the Force Be with You" (Only Fools and Horses), a 1983 television episode
- "May the Force Be With You", song on the album Hydrophonic by The Soup Dragons
- "May the Force Be with You Always", song by American country music artist Tom T. Hall
- "May the fourth" or "May the 4th be with you" – pun which gave rise to "Star Wars Day"

== See also ==
- "Mayor the Force Be with You", an episode of Murder in Successville
- The Force (disambiguation)
