= Thomas Leforge =

American writer

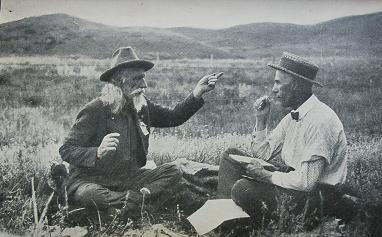
Thomas Leforge (left) discussing with Thomas B. Marquis, using hands language.

Thomas H. Leforge (July 9, 1850 – March 28, 1931) was an American writer who was the author of Memoirs of a White Crow Indian, his highly detailed account of living among the Crow Indian nation during the mid-to-late 19th century, first published in March 1928 by The Century Company at the hand of Thomas B. Marquis, and republished by the University of Nebraska Press.

== Early years ==
Born in Portsmouth, Ohio, on July 9, 1850, he moved with his family to Missouri, then to Kansas, before they finally left in 1864 for Virginia City, Montana, in search of gold. His family set out in prairie wagons with experienced guides on the Bridger Trail variant of the Bozeman Trail.

== The white Indian ==
Leforge joined the Montana militia in 1867 in the Bozeman, Montana, and Livingston, Montana, areas, acquiring both military experience and acquaintance with Native Americans tribes and ways (including raiding parties) by Piegan Blackfeet, his father working near Fort Ellis, Montana (these and all other narrative details herein derive from Leforge's own account).

In 1868 he attached himself to a party of Crow Indians under Yellow Leggings (a counselor of Blackbird) and befriended his son Three Irons. He acquired the Indian name of Fast Runner for sprinting, but was later renamed Horse Rider for equestrian skill, which name he would be known by in the tribe for the rest of his days (and unknown by his white name). Yellow Leggings formally adopted him in a camp in the Livingston area. Occasionally visiting his parents, Leforge divided his time chiefly between the Crow camps and Fort Ellis, becoming a camp follower during hostilities with Indians and closely befriending the young Sioux-French guide Mitch Bouyer (whose name his book spells Buoyer). Bouyer also lived among and married into the Crow, and joining Leforge in numerous actions. Leforge associated himself with the Mountain Crow, as distinguished from the River Crow, who tended to live to the north of the Yellowstone River.

Leforge became fluent in the Crow language and sympathetic to the people, marrying a girl named (in translation) Cherry and taking up residence near Fort Parker. Though hired formally as a blacksmith, he served the fort as a scout and intermediary, and the tribe as scout (or "wolf") and warrior. He was a financial intermediary for trade, a diplomat (negotiating a treaty with the Shoshone), and served in other capacities. He avoided scouting in pursuit of the Nez Perce because of sympathy for their case. Though he did scout against the Bannock, he condemned the attacks on them during their surrender. He briefly married his wife's cousin on the cousin's request, though they separated due to white disdain for polygamy. On Cherry's death due to illness while she was away, he married Bouyer's widow Mary, in honor of a mutual pledge to look after each other's family. They would later divorce amicably when he decided to return to white society to seek a fortune in mining and timber ventures. Leforge married again, with children as in his earlier marriages, though after a few years he and this wife also parted when he decided to return to the simpler life of Crow society. Ironically, by this time it was beginning to fade through cultural assimilation.

Leforge narrowly avoided death alongside Bouyer and the other Crow Scouts at the Battle of the Little Big Horn due to an injury he sustained when a pronghorn calf spooked his horse. He served as the de facto leader and cultural intermediary for the original Crow scouts and headed a second group into subsequent actions.

He died on March 28, 1931, from old age, according to his death certificate. His body was interred April 1, 1931, at Custer National Cemetery, in Crow Agency, Big Horn County, Montana, United States.

== Leforge's book ==
Besides Bouyer and his wife Mary, other names Leforge mentions or discusses, of interest to regional history include Nelson Story, Yankee Jim George, Barney Bravo, Chick Suce, Jim Beckwourth, Pierre Chien, Tom Bowyer, Skookum Jim, medicine man Father of All Buffalo, Colonel Eugene M. Baker, Jim Bridger, Chief Looking Glass, Chief Washakie of the Shoshone, Chief Joseph of the Nez Perce, Crow Chief Blackfoot, Curly (scout), General Hugh L. Scott, General Alfred Howe Terry, General John Gibbon, Lieutenant James Bradley, and General George Armstrong Custer.

Leforge's book is replete with non-professional first-hand anthropological observations and insights into the cultural, social, military, and spiritual ways of the Crow as well as other tribes before their significant assimilation into American culture.
