= LaForce =

LaForce is a surname. Notable people with the name include:

- Allie LaForce (born 1988), American sports journalist
- David S. LaForce, American artist
- Ernie Laforce (1916–2009), Canadian ice hockey player

== See also ==
- La-Force, surname
- LeForce, surname
