= The Force: Essex =

The Force: Essex is a British television programme documenting the work of Essex Police. It was broadcast in the United Kingdom on Sky One from May 2017.
