= Crow scouts =

Crow Scouts
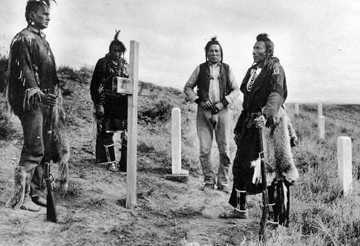
- Crow scouts visiting the Little Bighorn battlefield, circa 1913. From left to right; White Man Runs Him, Hairy Moccasin, Curly and Goes Ahead. Joseph Medicine Crow explained the main reason for men like these to enlist. They scouted against a long time Indian enemy, "... who were now in the old Crow country, menacing and often raiding the Crows in their reservation camps."
- Active: 1876 - 1879
- Allegiance: United States of America
- Branch: United States Army
- Type: Indian scouts
- Engagements: Great Sioux War: Battle of the Rosebud; Battle of the Little Big Horn

Commanders
- Notable commanders: James H. Bradley, George A. Custer, Nelson A. Miles, Charles A. Varnum

Crow Scouts worked with the United States Army in several conflicts, the first in 1876 during the Great Sioux War. Because the Crow Nation was at that time at peace with the United States, the army was able to enlist Crow warriors to help them in their encroachment against the Native Americans with whom they were at war. In 1873, the Crow called for U.S. military actions against the Lakota people they reported were trespassing into the newly designated Crow reservation territories.

A small group of Crow scouts had witnessed Lieutenant Colonel [Major General during the American Civil War only] George A. Custer's defeat at the Battle of the Little Bighorn in the Crow reservation. Many Crow fought in the Nez Perce War in 1877, and again in the Bannock War the next year. Crow scouts rode along with Assiniboine, Bannock and Cheyenne during Colonel Nelson A. Miles search for Sitting Bull north of the Missouri in 1879, and some former scouts fought in the Crow War of 1887.

== 1860s ==
The "Act to increase and fix the Military Peace Establishment of the United States", enacted on August 1, 1866, allowed the army to enlist Indigenous scouts. The scouts were supposed to earn the same wages as cavalry soldiers. Per the Treaty of Fort Laramie (1851), the lands west of the Powder River was designated as Crow territory. In 1866, Lakota were also continuing their traditional bison hunts in the region, and still considered it their territory, as well. After 1868, the Crow were living in the newly established Crow Indian Reservation in the heart of the 1851 treaty area in Montana.

== The 1871 Yellowstone Surveying Expedition ==
Three Crow guides joined the surveying expedition for the Northern Pacific Railway downstream on the northern bank of Yellowstone River in 1871. Major Eugene M. Baker may not have formally enlisted them. The scouts were "Blackfoot, Wolfbow and Pretty Lodge". The first two were old hands at helping the army, if they indeed were the Crow chief Blackfoot and the warrior Wolf Bow.

== Service history ==
=== Great Sioux War ===
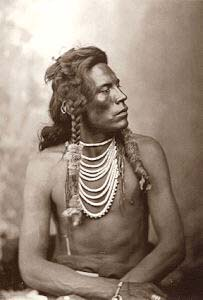
Curly, by David F. Barry, circa 1876.

==== Crow scouts with James H. Bradley ====
Several Crow warriors enlisted in the U.S. army at the beginning of the Great Sioux War in 1876. On April 10, Lieutenant James H. Bradley swore in 23 Crow scouts. Each scout received a red armband to wear on the left arm above the elbow, to set him apart from other Indigenous people. The Sioux curbed the mobility of the Crow when they got away with all their horses three weeks later. A few days later Half Yellow Face and Jack Rabbit Bull came back with three Sioux horses, "... proud of their exploit ...". Bradley describes the grief of the Crow scouts after Custer's defeat.

==== Crow with George Crook ====
Around 170 Crows fought with General George Crook at the Battle of the Rosebud without a legal registration.

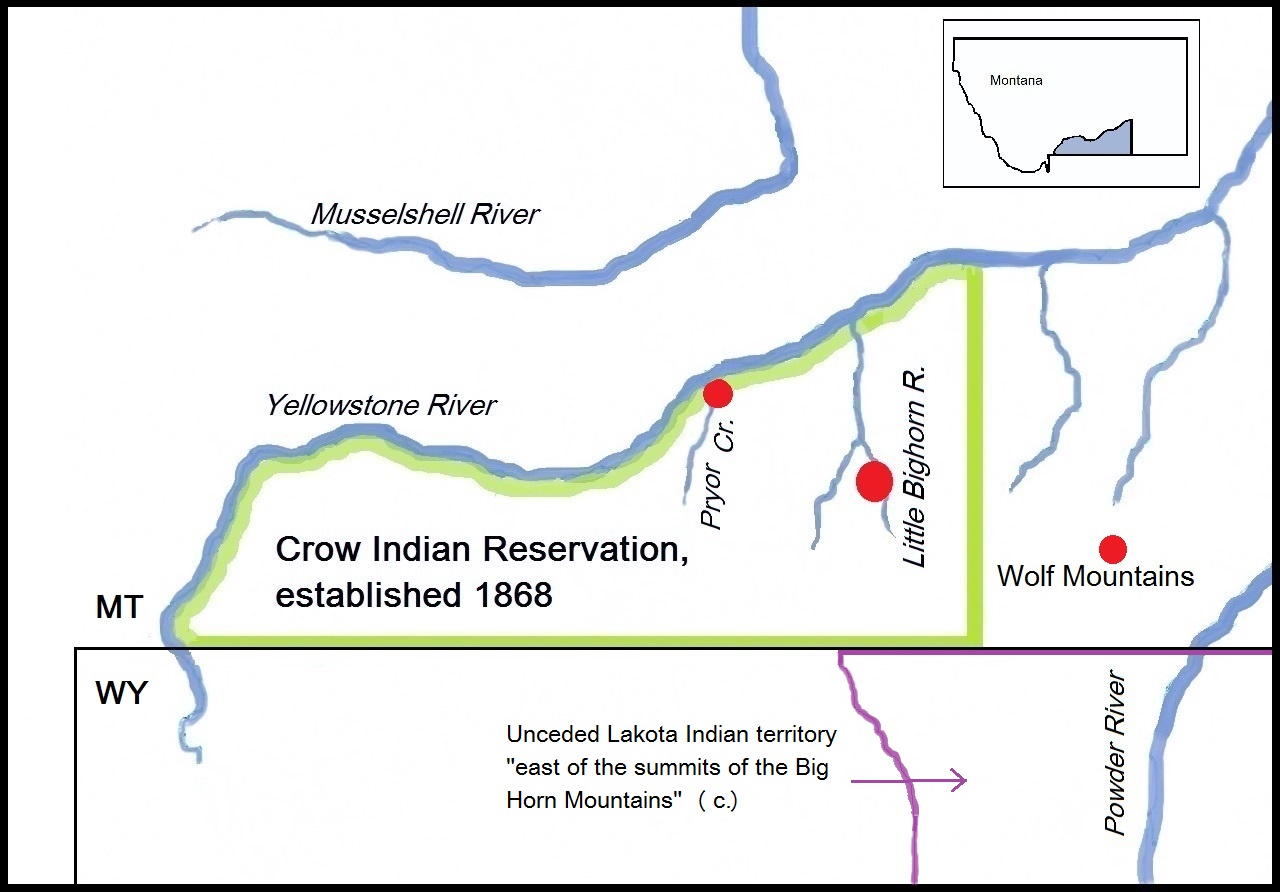
The battlefield of the Little Bighorn (1876) in the Crow Indian reservation in Montana and two other battlefields (1870s). "The Battle of the Little Bighorn, where the Sioux and Cheyenne had one of their largest gatherings ever, took place on the Crow reservation. In 1873, Crow chief Blackfoot had called for U.S. actions against the Indian intruders following a battle with the Sioux on Pryor Creek. Three Crows took part in the Battle of Wolf Mountains in 1877.

==== Crow with George Armstrong Custer ====
Crow scouts guided Custer's long awaited expedition to the Little Bighorn in the summer of 1876. "I now have some Crow scouts with me, as they are familiar with the country." wrote Custer in his second-last letter to his wife. Charles A. Varnum, Custer's chief of scouts, wrote "These Crows were in their own country".

Exactly a year after the fight, Hugh Lenox Scott went to the battlefield with all the Crow scouts serving Custer.

In 1909, decades after the battle, White Man Runs Him told Joseph K. Dixon how he and Hairy Moccasin had averted Custer's death earlier in the fight by keeping up a brisk fire at the counter-charging Cheyennes.

==== Crow with Nelson A. Miles ====
When a group of Crow scouts killed a five-man Lakota peace delegation under flag of truce in late December, 1876, the winter impeded fighting in the Yellowstone area flared up again. Once more, Crow scouts aided the army locating enemy camps. Three Crow were in action against both Lakotas in camp with Crazy Horse and Northern Cheyennes in the last battle of the Great Sioux War in the Wolf Mountains on January 8, 1877.

== 1880s ==
In 1887, some former scouts were involved in the brief Crow War (the Sword Bearer uprising) during which the United States Army fought a successful battle against hostile Crows just north of the Little Bighorn battlefield.

== See also ==
- Apache Scouts
- Arikara scouts
- Navajo Scouts
- Pawnee Scouts
- Black Seminole Scouts
