= Marcus Reno =

United States Army officer (1834–1889)

Marcus Albert Reno
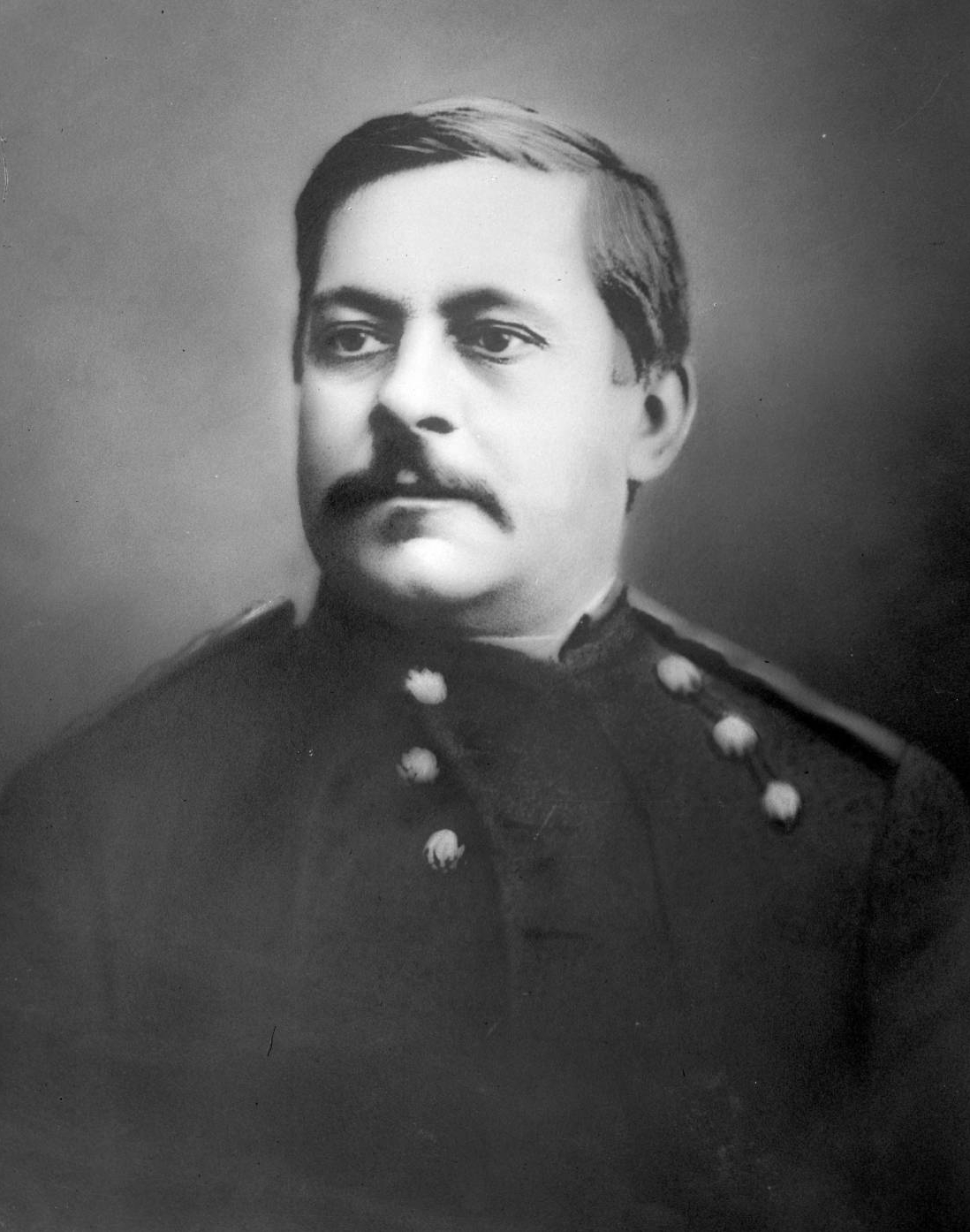
- Reno in 1876
- Born: November 15, 1834; Carrollton, Illinois, U.S.
- Died: March 30, 1889 (aged 54); Washington, D.C., U.S.
- Education: United States Military Academy
- Military career
- Allegiance: United States
- Branch: United States Army
- Service years: 1857–1880
- Rank: Colonel; Brevet Brigadier General
- Units: 1st U.S. Cavalry Regiment; 7th U.S. Cavalry Regiment
- Commands: 12th Pennsylvania Cavalry Regiment
- Conflicts: American Indian Wars; American Civil War

Colonel Marcus Albert Reno (November 15, 1834 – March 30, 1889) was a United States Army officer. He served in the American Civil War where he was a combatant in major battles, and later under George Armstrong Custer in the Great Sioux War against the Lakota (Sioux) and Northern Cheyenne.

Reno played a prominent role in the Battle of the Little Bighorn, where he did not support Custer's battlefield position, remaining instead in a defensive formation with his troops about 4 miles (6.4 km) away. There has been longstanding controversy over his command decisions in the course of one of the most infamous defeats in U.S. military history.

== Early life and career ==
Marcus Albert Reno was born November 15, 1834, in Carrollton, Illinois, to James Reno (originally Reynaud) and his wife, the former Charlotte (Hinton) Miller, a divorcee with one daughter, Harriet Cordelia Miller, from her first marriage. The couple had six children together: Eliza, Leonard, Cornelia, Marcus, Sophronia, and Henry. Charlotte, the mother of Reno died June 25, 1848, after an extended illness. Marcus was 13.

His future uncertain, at the age of 15, Reno wrote to the Secretary of War to learn how to enter the United States Military Academy at West Point, New York. After some initial disappointment, he was admitted and attended West Point from 1851 until 1857, requiring two extra years due to excessive demerits. Reno graduated June 28, 1857, 20th in a class of 38. He was assigned to the 1st U.S. Dragoons as a brevet second lieutenant. He reported to the regiment at Carlisle, Pennsylvania, on July 1, 1857.

In March 1858 he was ordered to duty with his regiment at Fort Walla Walla in Washington Territory, where he reported in September 1858. With the outbreak of the Civil War, the 1st Dragoons were renamed as 1st Cavalry Regiment and transferred through Panama to Washington, D.C., arriving in January 1862. Reno, now a captain, fought in the Battle of Antietam. He was injured at the Battle of Kelly's Ford in Virginia on March 17, 1863, when his horse was shot and fell on him, causing a hernia. He was awarded the brevet rank of major for gallant and meritorious conduct. After convalescing, he returned to fight July 10, 1863, at the Battle of Williamsport.

In 1864, Reno took part in the battles of Haw's Shop, Cold Harbor, Trevilian Station, Darbytown Road, Winchester (3rd), Kearneysville, Smithfield Crossing and the Cedar Creek. For his service at Cedar Creek, he was brevetted lieutenant colonel. In January 1865, he entered volunteer service as colonel of the 12th Pennsylvania Volunteer Cavalry, later commanding a brigade against John Mosby's guerrillas. Reno received an appointment as brevet colonel in the Regular Army (United States), to rank from March 13, 1865, for "meritorious services during the war." On January 13, 1866, President Andrew Johnson nominated Reno for appointment to the grade of brevet brigadier general, U.S. Volunteers, to rank from March 13, 1865, and the United States Senate confirmed the appointment on March 12, 1866.

Following the war, Reno served briefly as an instructor at West Point. On October 31, 1865, he became judge advocate of the Military Commission in New Orleans, bringing his family with him. On December 4, 1865, he was assigned as provost marshal of the Freedmen's Bureau there. On August 6, 1866, he was reassigned to Fort Vancouver as assistant inspector general of the Department of the Columbia. In December 1868, he was promoted to major and served on court martial duty at Fort Hays, Kansas. On July 21, 1871, he joined the 7th Cavalry as commander at Spartanburg, South Carolina. After several special assignments, he joined the consolidated regiment at Fort Abraham Lincoln in October 1875.

== Battle of the Little Bighorn ==
Reno was the senior officer serving under Custer at the Battle of the Little Bighorn in June 1876. Reno, with three companies totalling 140 men, was to attack the Indian village from the south, while Custer with five companies intended to cross the Little Bighorn River farther north and come into the village from the opposite side; Custer ordered Captain Frederick Benteen with three companies to reconnoiter the areas south of the Sioux camp, and then return. Captain Thomas McDougall's company escorted the pack train carrying ammunition and supplies. Historians believe the cavalry officers did not understand how large the village was. Estimates vary as to the size of the village (up to 10,000 teepees) and the number of warriors engaged. After visiting the battlefield, General Nelson Appleton Miles estimated that the number of "warriors did not exceed thirty-five hundred", while Captain Philo Clark, who interviewed a number of Indian survivors, "considered twenty-six hundred as the maximum number". Miles concluded, "At all events, they greatly outnumbered Custer's command."

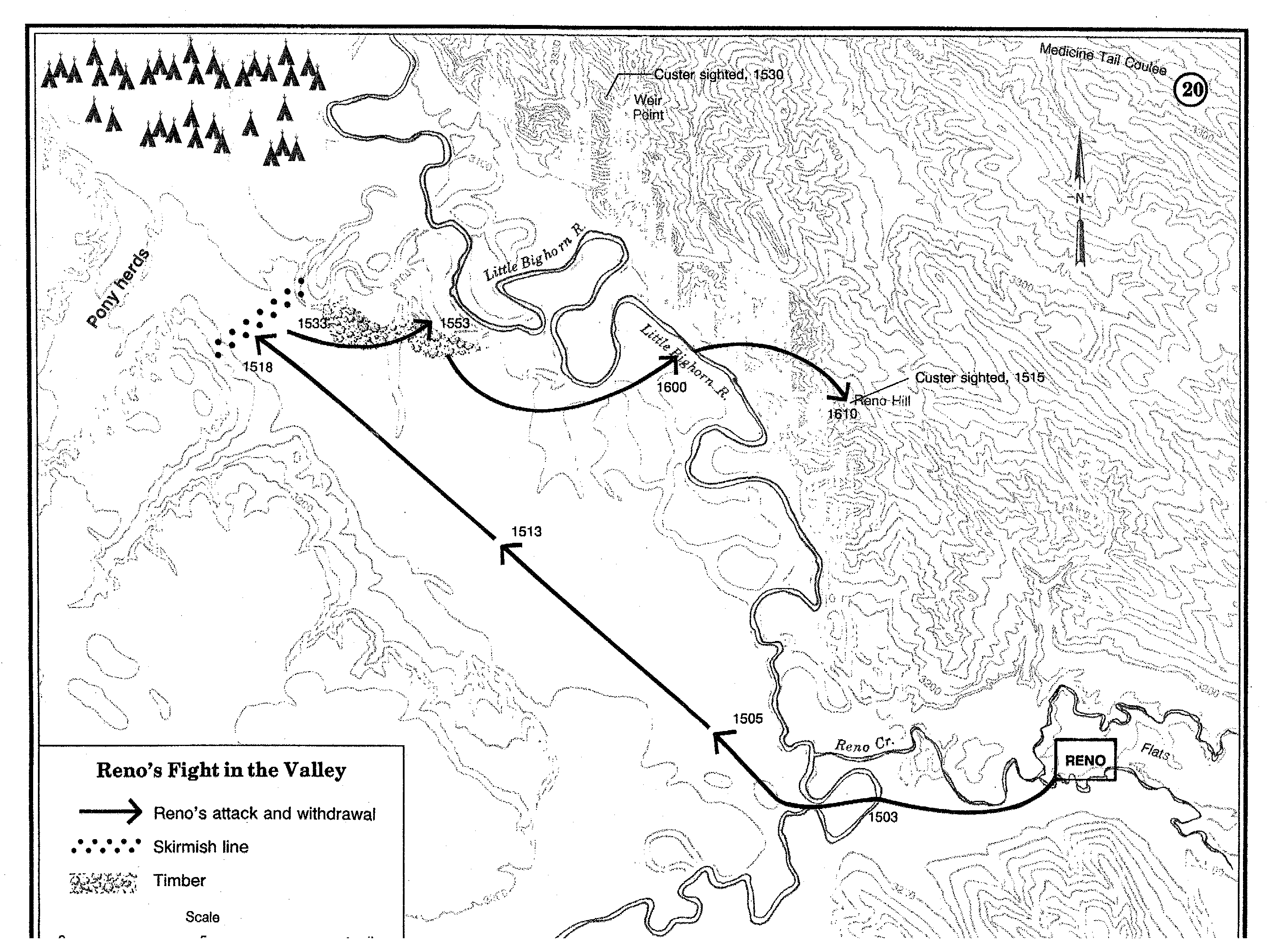
Movement of Major Reno's three companies

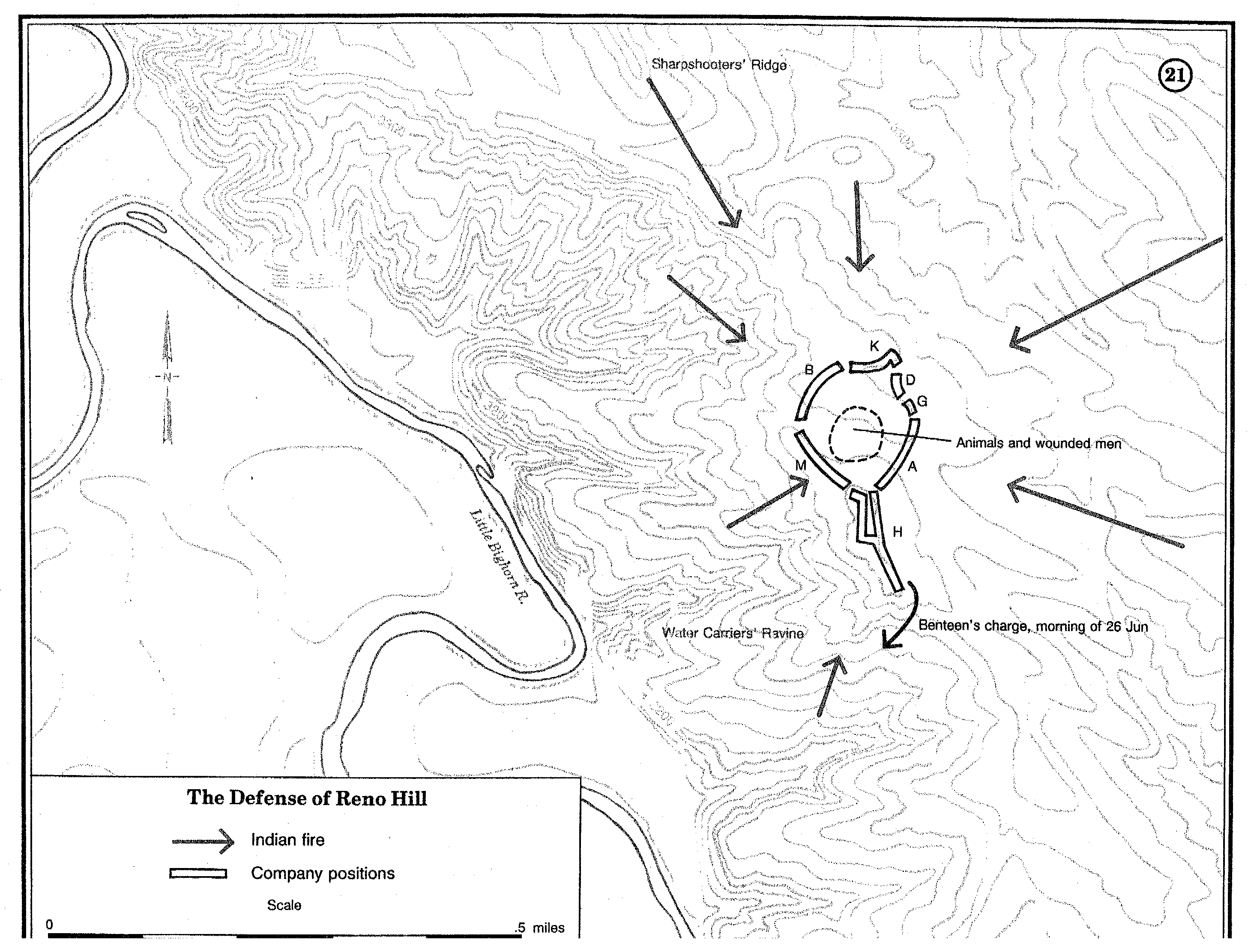
Reno–Benteen defensive position

Reno set off for the village. Crossing the ford, he seemed uncertain. Dr. Porter, riding with him, thought it odd when Reno asked if Porter wanted his carbine. His horse was unruly and "the gun got in the way." There was initially no resistance as the soldiers skirted the timber. After "not over ten minutes", and as they came into view of village, Reno ordered "Halt!" and "Prepare to fight on foot!"." He later explained, "I... saw that I was being drawn into some trap."

The initially few Indian warriors ahead were still several hundred yards away when troops dismounted and formed a skirmish line. Soon, however, the troops were outflanked by hundreds of warriors. Reno and his command fell back into the timber along the river. Near the river the Arikara scout Bloody Knife was shot through the head while next to Reno. Most of the other scouts slipped away and escaped. Reno led a hasty scramble across the river and up the bluffs on the other side. His retreat became a rout. There he was met by Benteen with his three companies. Out of breath, Reno called out, "For God's sake, Benteen! Halt your command and help me! I've lost half my men! By this time 40 of Reno's 140 men already had been killed, 7 were wounded, and an undetermined number had been left behind in the timber, although most of those abandoned would later manage to rejoin him.

Shortly afterward, they were surprised that the pursuing warriors began to turn away from them and head north. Two miles back, McDougall, marching with the pack train, heard gunfire, "a dull sound that resounded through the hills". The troops with Benteen and Reno—even Lieutenant Edward Settle Godfrey, who was deaf in one ear—also heard it. Both Reno and Benteen claimed they never heard it. Further, they did not at once advance to find out the source, which would later gave rise to charges that they had abandoned Custer.

Concerned with their seeming indifference to Custer's situation and not waiting for orders, Captain Thomas Weir rode north about a mile toward the sound of gunfire to the present-day Weir Point, followed by his company. There they could see dust and smoke some three miles farther north. They first assumed it was some of Custer's men. As they watched, however, they saw warriors emerging from the smoke, heading toward them, "thick as grasshoppers in a harvest field".

Soon Benteen arrived. Looking at the situation, he realized this was "a hell of a place to fight Indians." He decided they should retreat to their original position, now called the "Reno-Benteen defense site" or simply "Reno Hill". Meanwhile, Captain McDougall had arrived at the site with the packtrain. Lieutenant Edward Mathey years later told Walter Camp that Reno greeted them holding up a bottle of whiskey and calling out, "I got half a bottle yet." McDougall found Reno disoriented, perhaps suffering from shock, certainly taking no interest in their precarious situation. He urged Benteen to "take charge and run the thing." Benteen quickly established a horseshoe-shaped defensive perimeter on the bluffs near where he and Reno had met earlier. They were attacked immediately and throughout the rest of the day.

As night fell the attack slackened off, while the Lakota village was alive with celebration. About 2:30 a.m., two rifle shots signaled a resumption of the attack. The firing resumed at dawn and continued until late in the afternoon, when the soldiers saw the distant village being broken up and the tribes moving south. The next morning, the 27th, the surviving troops moved closer to the river, where General Alfred Terry and Colonel John Gibbon and their forces found them. Thirteen survivors were awarded the Medal of Honor for their bravery in the battle. For Reno, criticism was his only reward. Between 1868 and 1878 the Army conducted nineteen attacks on Indian villages. Only two were unsuccessful: Reno's and Custer's, which was not merely unsuccessful, but disastrous.

== Later military career ==
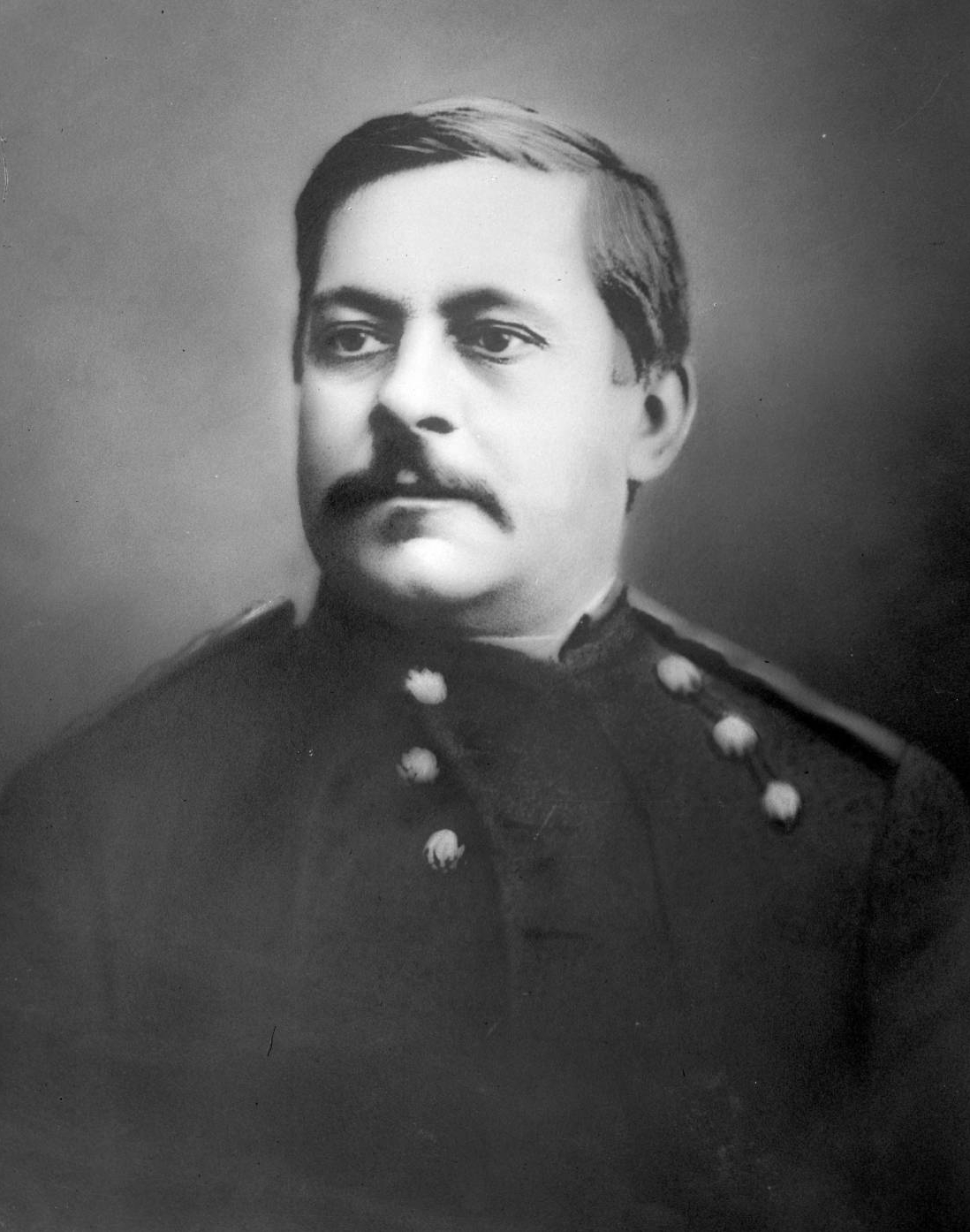
Marcus A. Reno

After the Battle of the Little Bighorn, Reno was assigned command of Fort Abercrombie, Dakota Territory. There, in December 1876, he was charged with making unwanted advances toward the wife of another officer of the Seventh Cavalry, Captain James M. Bell, while Bell was away. A general court-martial hearing began in St. Paul on May 8, 1877. Reno was found guilty on six of seven charges against him, and ordered dismissed from the army. Later, President Rutherford B. Hayes reduced the dismissal sentence to two years.

Responding to charges of cowardice and drunkenness at the Little Bighorn, Reno demanded and was granted a court of inquiry. The court convened in Chicago on January 13, 1879, and called as witnesses most of the surviving officers who had been in the fight. After 26 days of testimony, Judge Advocate General W. M. Dunn submitted his opinion and recommendations to the Secretary of War George W. McCrary on February 21, 1879. He concluded, "I concur with the court in its exoneration of Major Reno from the charges of cowardice which have been brought against him." He added, "The suspicion or accusation that Gen. Custer owed his death and the destruction of his command to the failure of Major Reno, through incompetency or cowardice, to go to his relief, is considered as set to rest...."

The court of inquiry did little to change public opinion. Enlisted men later stated they had been coerced into giving a positive report to both Reno and Benteen. Lieutenant Charles DeRudio told Walter Mason Camp "that there was a private understanding between a number of officers that they would do all they could to save Reno." In 1904, a story in the Northwestern Christian Advocate claimed that Reno had admitted to its former editor that "his strange actions" during and after the Battle of Little Bighorn were "due to drink".

In 1879, while commanding officer at Ft. Meade, Dakota Territory, Reno again faced court-martial, charged with conduct unbecoming an officer, including a physical assault on a subordinate officer, William Jones Nicholson. He was convicted of conduct prejudicial to good order and discipline, and dismissed from the service April 1, 1880. Reno took an apartment in Washington D.C., where he doggedly pursued restoration of his military rank while working as an examiner in the Bureau of Pensions.

== Family ==
Reno married Mary Hannah Ross of Harrisburg in 1863. They were the parents of a son, Robert Ross Reno, and owned a farm near New Cumberland, Pennsylvania, in Cumberland County. When she died of kidney disease in Harrisburg on July 10, 1874, Reno was in the field in Montana's Milk River Valley. On learning of her death, he requested leave to attend her funeral. He started for home only to learn that General Alfred Terry had denied his request.

On October 20, 1882, he married Isabella Steele Ray McGunnegle of New York City. She was the widow of Lieutenant Commander Wilson McGunnegle and a mother of three adult children, including army officer George K. McGunnegle. Almost immediately, friction arose between the new Mrs. Reno and her eighteen year old stepson Robert. She was concerned with his excessive gambling and wild lifestyle, while he objected to her constant supervision. They were living at the Lochiel Hotel in Harrisburg where Robert had run up a large bill. There, on Christmas night 1883, Robert, without invitation, entered the room of actress Carrie Swain through a window. Ms. Swain refused to press charges, but the management insisted the Renos leave. Reno sent his son to live with an uncle in Pittsburgh. The couple became estranged and over the next few years separated. Finally, Isabella brought charges of neglect, and in October 1888, she filed for divorce. The court did not immediately act on her request and in late February, 1889, Reno filed for divorce, claiming Isabella had "deserted him in February 1887". Isabella died in Manila on January 14, 1904.

Robert Ross Reno married Maria Ittie Kinney in May 1885. His business ventures failed and he became a traveling salesman. Ittie seldom heard from him; when she did, he asked for money. On August 19, 1898, he sent a telegram to her brother-in-law, "Make Ittie get a divorce or I will." She filed for divorce in October; it was granted June 22, 1899. She died on June 4, 1941.

== Death, military review and reburial ==
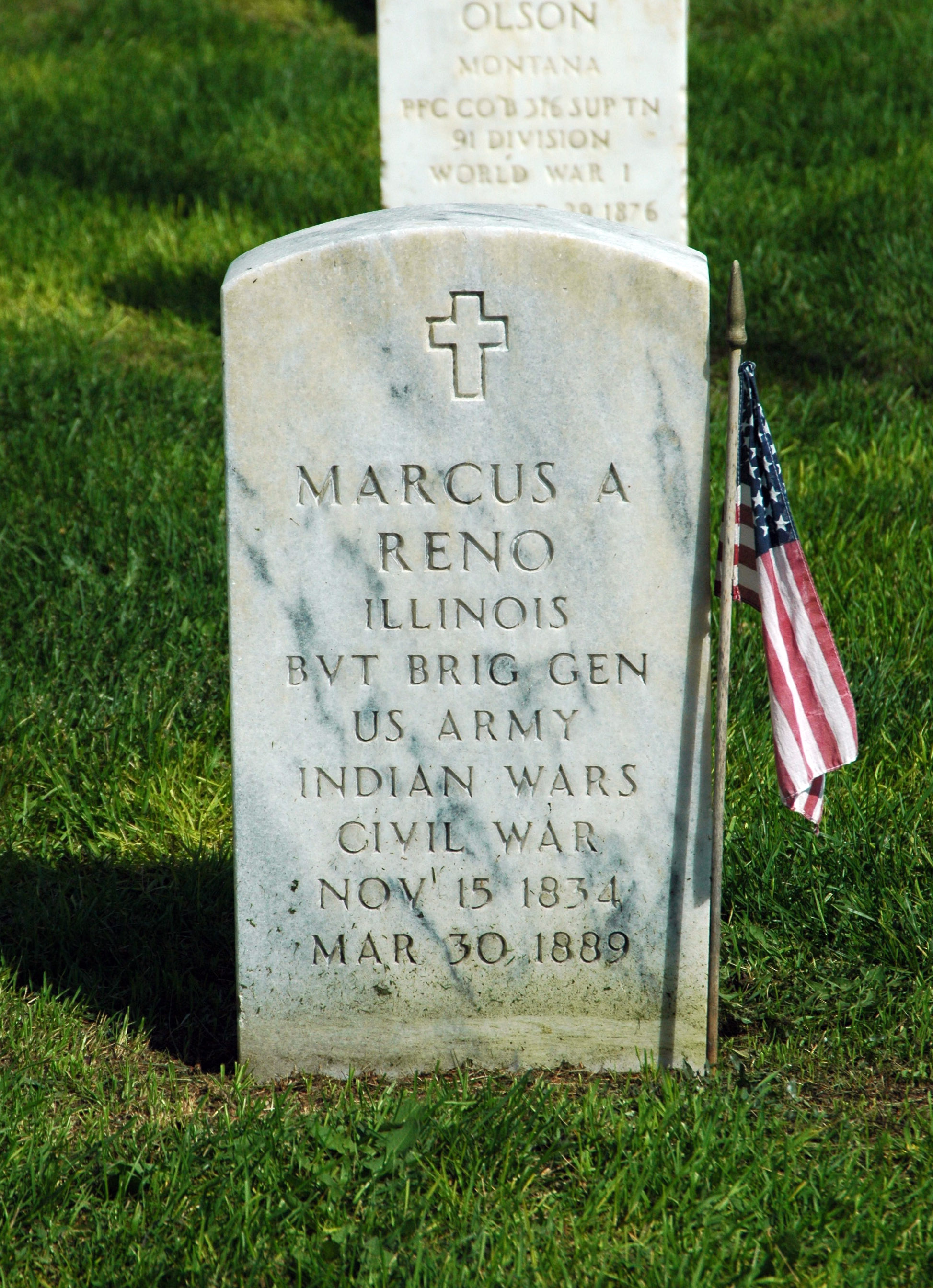
Marcus Reno gravestone at Custer National Cemetery

By mid-March, 1889, Reno was diagnosed with oral cancer. He was admitted to Providence Hospital in Washington on March 19, 1889, and underwent surgery the same day. While hospitalized he developed pneumonia and died at the age of 54 in the early hours of March 30, 1889. No preparations had been made for his burial, so it was arranged that he be temporarily interred at Washington's Glenwood Cemetery until he could be reinterred with his first wife at the Ross family plot in Harrisburg, Pennsylvania. No room could be found for his remains there, so his temporary, unmarked grave seemed his final resting place.

Years later, there was a move to erect a monument to Reno at the Little Bighorn Battlefield. Custer's widow Elizabeth Bacon Custer spoke out against a memorial to Reno at the site. Writing in 1926, she stated "I long for a memorial to our heroes on the battlefield of the Little Big Horn [sic] but not to single out for honor, the one coward of the regiment."

In 1967, at the request of Reno's great-nephew Charles, a U.S. military review board reopened the 1880 court-martial. It reversed the decision, ruling Reno's dismissal from the service improper and awarding him an honorable discharge.

On September 9, 1967, Reno's remains were reinterred with honors (including a church ceremony in Billings, Montana, and an eleven-gun salute at his gravesite) in the Custer National Cemetery, on the Little Bighorn battlefield. Reno was the only participant of the Little Bighorn battle to be buried with such honors at the cemetery named for his former commander.

== Miscellany ==
At the time of his appointment to West Point, Reno was about 5 ft 8 in (173 cm) tall and weighed about 145 pounds (66 kg). He had dark hair, brown eyes and a dark complexion.

While serving at Fort Vancouver, Reno became a Freemason, joining Washington Lodge #4. He was initiated on July 6, 1867, made a Fellowcraft Mason on August 3, and raised to Master Mason on August 21, 1867.

== Portrayals in films and television ==
Liam Sullivan portrayed Colonel Marcus Reno, with Barry Atwater as Custer, in the 1960 episode, "Gold, Glory, and Custer - Prelude" of the ABC/Warner Brothers western television series, Cheyenne, with Clint Walker in the title role of Cheyenne Bodie. In the 1965 movie, "The Great Sioux Massacre", directed by Sidney Salkow, the part of Major Reno was portrayed by actor Joseph Cotten.

Reno was portrayed by actor Ty Hardin in the 1967 film Custer of the West. He was played by William Daniels in the 1977 TV movie The Court-Martial of George Armstrong Custer. Reno was portrayed by Michael Medeiros in the 1991 television mini-series Son of the Morning Star.

== See also ==
- List of American Civil War brevet generals (Union)
- White Swan
- Half Yellow Face
