= Crow Tribal Administration =

The Crow Tribal General Council, the governing body of the Crow Tribe, through the adoption of the 2001 Crow Tribal Constitution, established a three-branch government with a separation of powers.

The executive branch is composed of four independently elected officials, the chairman, vice-chairman, secretary, and vice-secretary, and all agencies and departments. The four elected officials serve concurrent four year terms (term limit of two).

The legislative branch is composed of 18 legislators (called "senators" as a matter of courtesy), with three elected in staggered terms from each of the six districts of the Crow Indian Reservation. The Crow senators serve four year terms with no term limits.

The judicial branch is composed of courts established in the Crow Law and Order Code. Currently, there is a Crow Tribal Court (general jurisdiction), Crow Juvenile Court, and a Crow Court of Appeals. A Traditional Supreme Court has been established by law but is not yet implemented. The judges of the Crow Tribal Court are elected to unlimited, four-year terms.

Term of Office	Chairperson	Vice Chairperson	Secretary	Vice-Secretary
1920–1921	Ralph Saco			
1921–1927	James Carpenter			
1927–1934	William Bends			
1934–1938	Hartford Bear Class			
1938–1941	Charles Yarlott			
1941–1946	Henry Pretty on Top			
1946–1954	Robert Yellowtail			
1954–1956	William Wall			
1956–1958	Posie Whiteman			
1958–1960	Posie Whiteman			
1960–1962	John Cummings			
1962–1964	John Cummings			
1964–1966	John Wilson	Douglas Adams	Donald Deernose	Daniel Old Elk
1966–1968	Edison Real Bird	Edward Little Light	Joseph Ten Bear	Pauline Small
1968–1970	Edison Real Bird	Edward Little Light	Joseph Ten Bear	Pauline Small
1970–1972	Edison Real Bird	Edward Little Light	Joseph Ten Bear	Pauline Small
1972–1974	David Stewart			
1974–1976	Patrick Stands Over Bull			
1976–1977	Patrick Stands Over Bull			
1977–1978	Forest Horn			
1978–1980	Forest Horn			
1980–1982	Forest Horn			
1982–1984	Donald Stewart			
1984–1986	Donald Stewart			
1986–1988	Richard Real Bird			
1988–1990	Richard Real Bird			Clara Nomee
1990–1992	Clara Nomee	Joseph Pickett	Blaine Small	
1992–1994	Clara Nomee	Joseph Pickett	Blaine Small	
1994–1996	Clara Nomee	Joseph Pickett	Dennis Big Hair	
1996–1998	Clara Nomee	Joseph Pickett	Dennis Big Hair	
1998–2000	Clara Nomee	Joseph Pickett	Dennis Big Hair	Cornelius Little Light
2000–2001	Clifford Birdinground (Note: New constitution extends term of office to 2004.)	Vincent Goes Ahead	Tilton Old Bull (Note: Secretary's Impeachment)	Larney Little Owl
2001–2002	Clifford Birdinground (Note: Chairperson's Resignation)	Vincent Goes Ahead	Larney Little Owl (Note: Vice-Secretary becomes Secretary)	Hubert Two Leggins (Note: Completed remaining term of office)
2002	Vincent Goes Ahead (Note: Acting Chairperson; Carl Venne elected.)	Vincent Goes Ahead	Larney Little Owl	Hubert Two Leggins
2002–2004	Carl Venne (Note: Filled remaining term of office.)	Vincent Goes Ahead	Larney Little Owl	Hubert Two Leggins
2004–2007	Carl Venne	Cedric Black Eagle	Andrew Old Elk (Note: Died in 2007.)	Darrin Old Coyote
2007	Carl Venne	Cedric Black Eagle	Office Vacant	Darrin Old Coyote (Note: Acting Secretary)
2007–2009	Carl Venne (Note: Died in 2009.)	Cedric Black Eagle	Scott Russell (Note: Filled remaining term of office)	Darrin Old Coyote
2009	Cedric Black Eagle (Note: Filled remaining term of office; Elected in 2009)	Office Vacant	Scott Russell	Darrin Old Coyote
2009–2012	Cedric Black Eagle	Calvin Jefferson	Scott Russell	Darrin Old Coyote
2012–2016	Darrin Old Coyote	Dana Wilson	Alvin Not Afraid Jr.	Shawn Backbone
2016–2020	Alvin Not Afraid Jr.	Carlson Goes Ahead	Rudolph Old Crow Sr.	Shawn Backbone
2020–	Frank White Clay	Lawrence DeCrane	Levi Black Eagle	Channis D. Whiteman

== See also ==
- Crow chairperson
