= Crow Indian Reservation =

Coordinates: 45°23′08″N 107°44′48″W

- Indian reservation
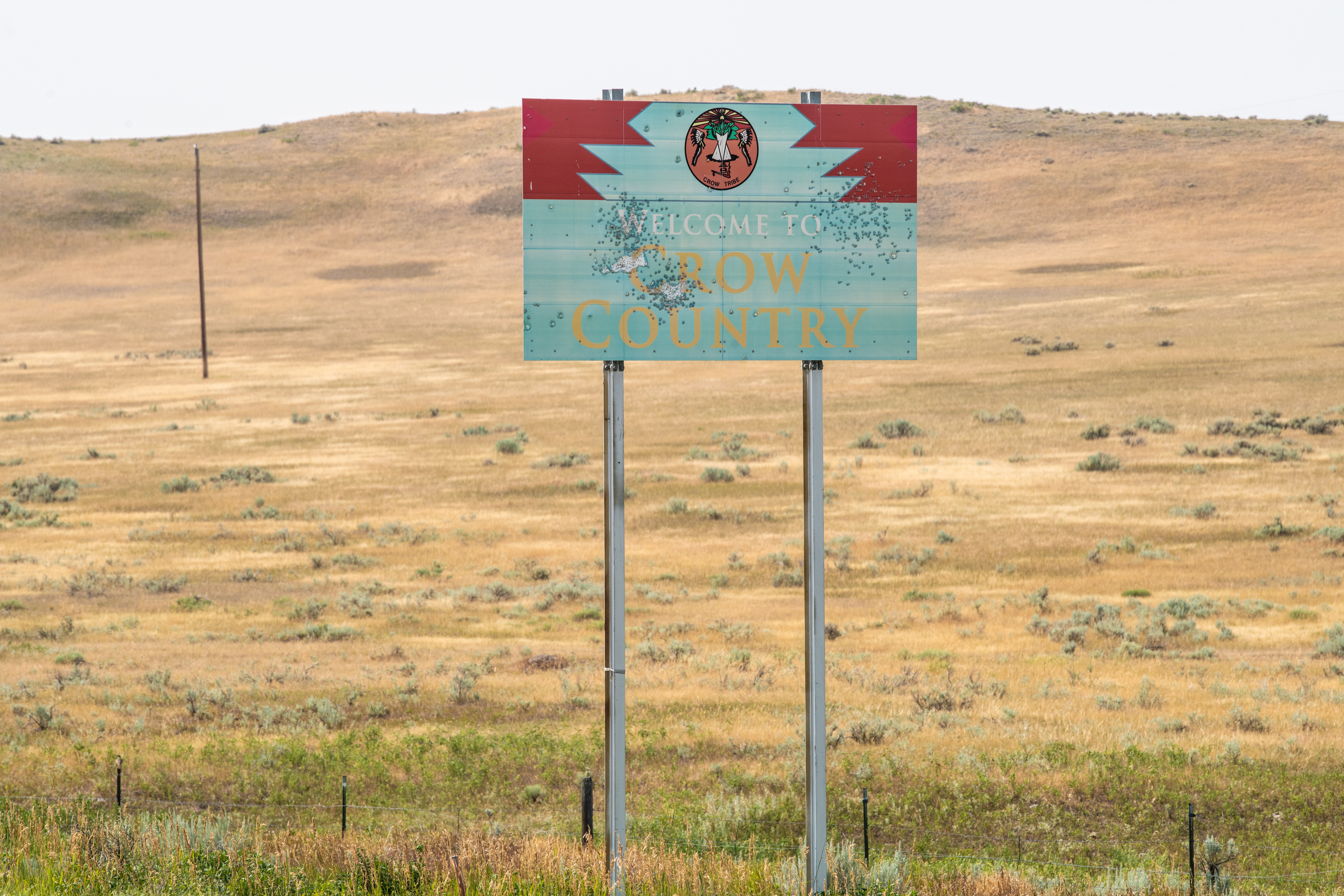
- Welcome sign

- Location in Montana
- Tribe: Crow (Apsáalooke)
- Country: United States
- State: Montana
- Counties: Big Horn; Treasure; Yellowstone
- Established: May 7, 1868
- Headquarters: Crow Agency

Government
  - Body: Crow Tribe Executive Branch
  - Chairman: Frank White Clay
  - Vice-Chairman: Lawrence Decrane
  - Secretary: Levi Black Eagle
  - Vice-Secretary: Channis D. Whiteman

Area
  - Total: 3,606.54 sq mi (9,340.9 km^{2})
  - Land: 3,593.56 sq mi (9,307.3 km^{2})

Population (2017)
  - Total: 7,096
  - Density: 1.975/sq mi (0.7624/km^{2})
- GDP: $1.9 Billion (2018)
- Website: crow-nsn.gov

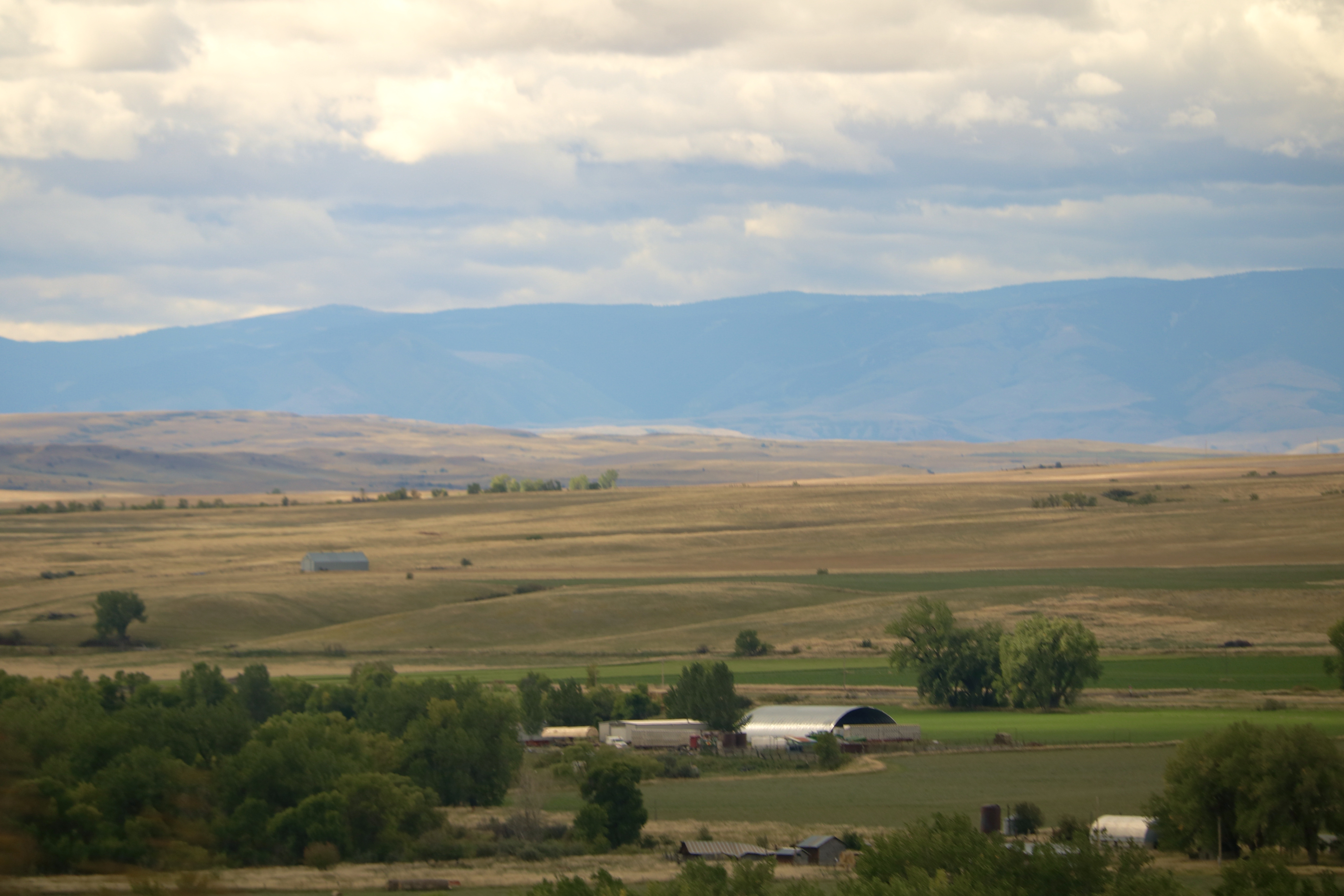
Crow Tribe landforms near Lodge Grass, Montana.

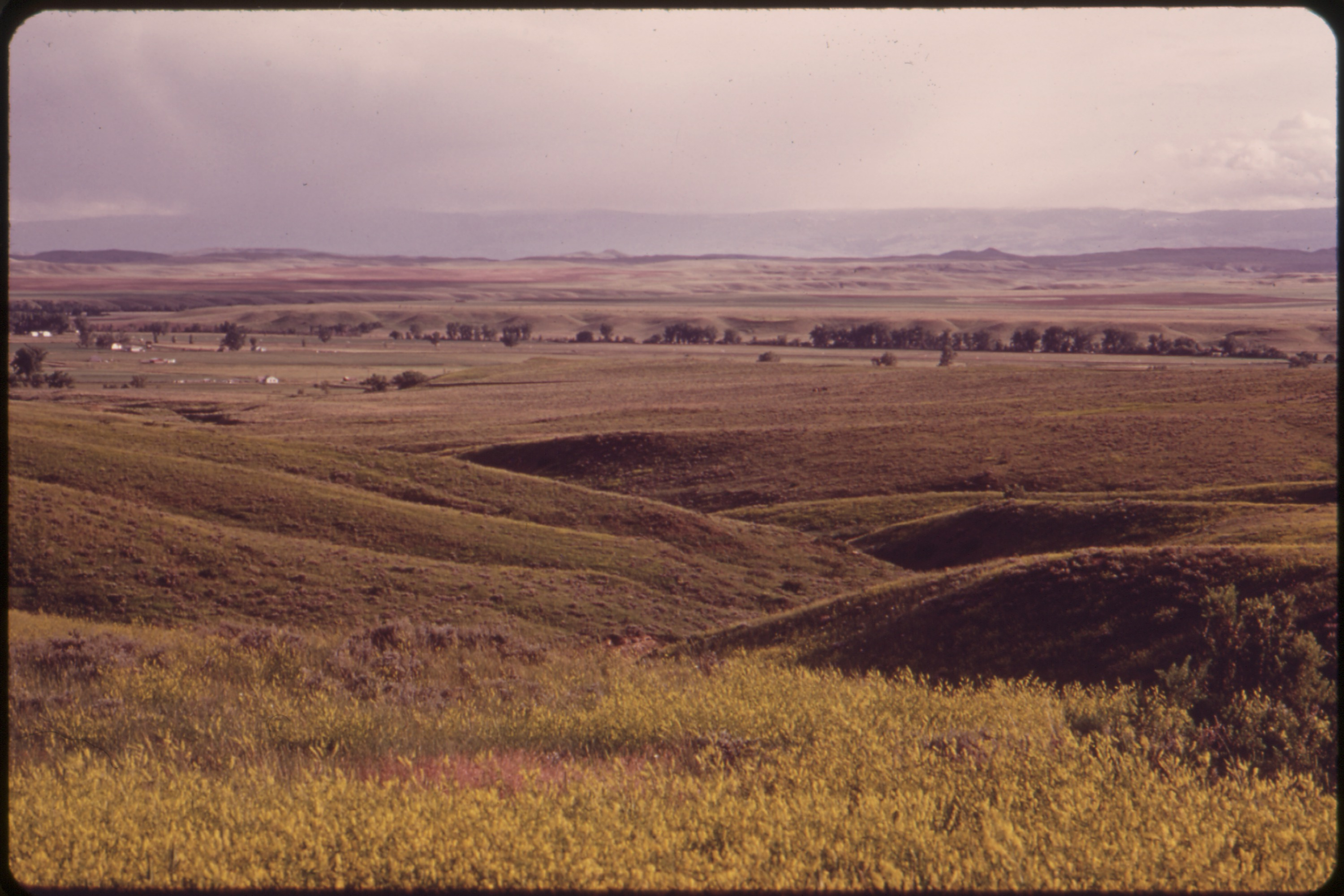
Ranch lands and prairie near Little Bighorn Battlefield National Monument, part of the Crow Indian Reservation, 1973

The Crow Indian Reservation is the homeland of the Crow Tribe. Established in 1868, the reservation is located in parts of Big Horn, Yellowstone, and Treasure counties in southern Montana in the United States. The Crow Tribe has an enrolled membership of approximately 11,000, of whom 7,900 reside in the reservation. 20% speak Crow as their first language.

Reservation headquarters are in Crow Agency, Montana. The tribe is known as "Apsáalooke" which means "children of the large-beaked bird". This was later misinterpreted as "Crow".

== Geography ==
The reservation, the largest of the seven Indian reservations in Montana, is located in south-central Montana, bordered by Wyoming to the south and the Northern Cheyenne Indian Reservation to the east. The reservation includes the northern end of the Bighorn Mountains, Wolf Mountains, and Pryor Mountains. The Bighorn River flows north from the Montana-Wyoming state line, joining the Little Bighorn just east of Hardin. Part of the reservation boundary runs along the ridgeline separating Pryor Creek and the Yellowstone River. The city of Billings is approximately 10 miles (16 km) northwest of the reservation boundary.

It has a land area of 3,593.56 square miles (9,307.3 km^{2}) and a total area of 3,606.54 square miles (9,340.9 km^{2}), making it either the fifth or sixth-largest reservation in the country (alternating with the Standing Rock Reservation depending on whether water areas are counted).

== History ==
The reservation is located in old Crow country. In August 1805, fur trader Francois-Antoine Larocque camped at the Little Bighorn River and traveled through the area with a Crow group.

The contemporary reservation lies at the center of the Crow Indian territory described in the 1851 Fort Laramie treaty.

Pressure from Europeans north of Yellowstone River and a Lakota (Sioux) invasion into Crow treaty guaranteed land from the east (the lead-up to Red Cloud's War) made the 1860s a trying time for the Crow. "Oglalas under Crazy Horse and Red Cloud and Hunkpapas and Minneconjous under Sitting Bull continued to follow the dwindling buffalo herds west from the Powder River, while gold seekers travelled north into the [Crow] region along the Bozeman [Trail]." Steamboats on the Missouri River brought additional prospectors into the Yellowstone area. The situation called for a new Crow treaty.

On May 7, 1868, the Crow sold around 30 million acres of their 1851 territory and agreed to live in a reservation. The border to the south was the 45th degree of north latitude, while the 107th degree of longitude west was the eastern border. Both borderlines met the Yellowstone at a point. The connection of these two points followed the course of the river and made up the last border of the 1868 reservation. It comprised about eight million acres.

Major F. D. Pease was the first civil agent at the Crow reservation, from 1870 to 1874.

Land cessions to the United States approved in 1882, 1892 and 1906 cut the western and northernmost part of the 1868 reservation.

Crow chief Plenty Coups, Robert Yellowtail and others stopped efforts to open the reservation in 1917. In a hotel room in Washington, D.C., they opened a bundle over the incense of buffalo chips from animals in the National Zoo and prayed for help. "The next day the attempted appropriation of their land was soundly defeated."

Yellowtail made headlines when he became superintendent of his own tribe's reservation in 1934, the first Indian to do so.

The reservation got its present shape after moderate land cuts in 1937 and in connection with the construction of the Bighorn Canyon Dam in the 1960s.

During the 1960s, Pauline Small became the first woman Crow reservation tribal official.

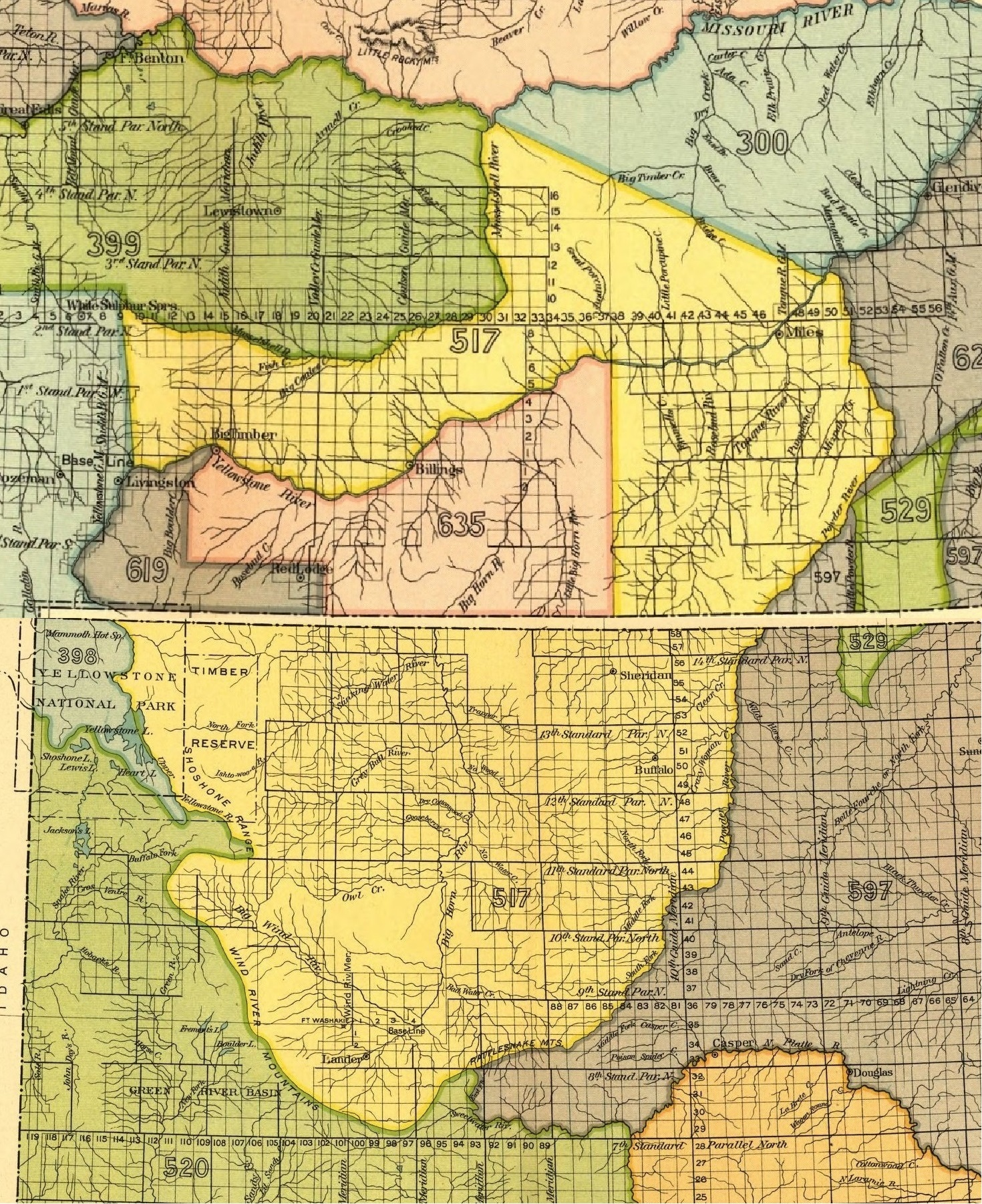
Crow Indian territory (area 517, 619 and 635) as described in Fort Laramie treaty (1851), present Montana and Wyoming

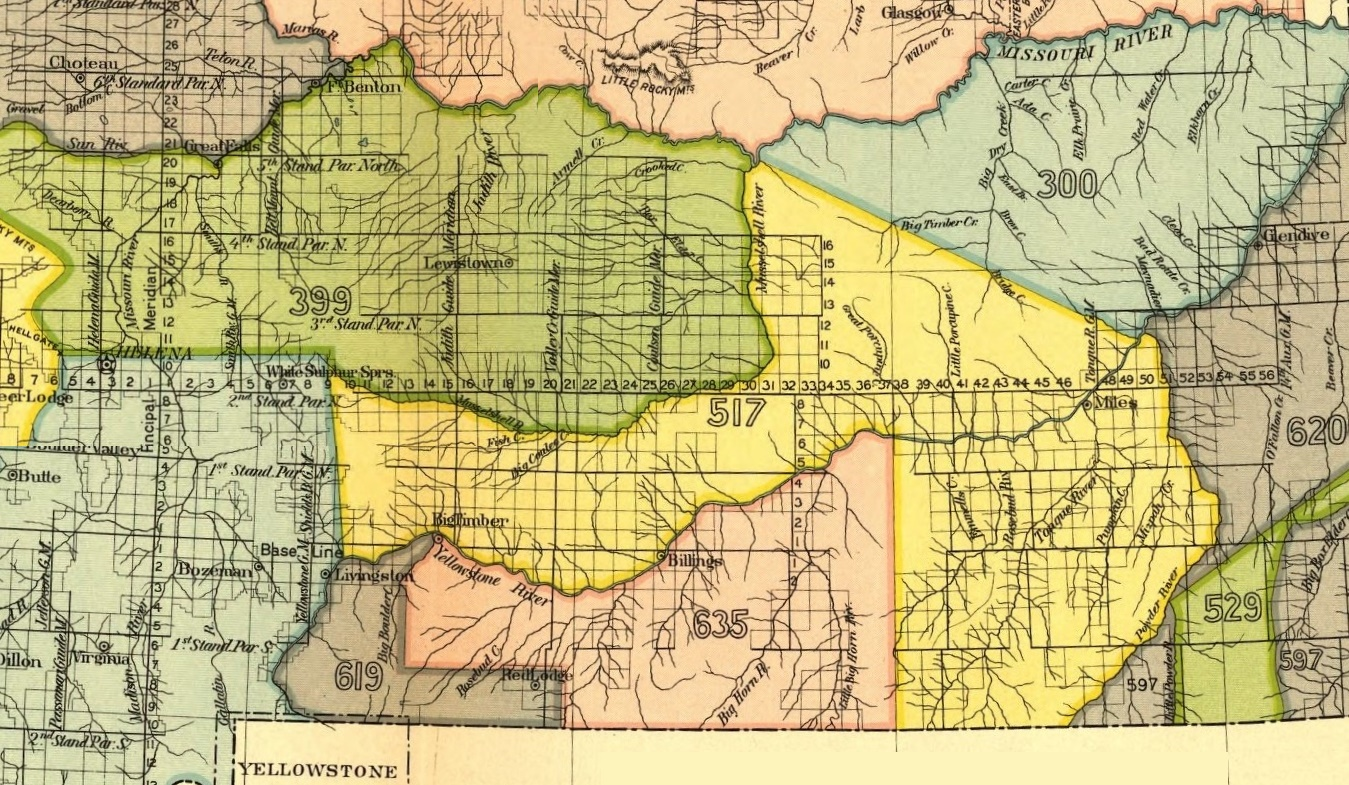
Crow Indian Reservation, 1868 (area 619 and 635). Yellow area 517 is 1851 Crow treaty land ceded to the U.S

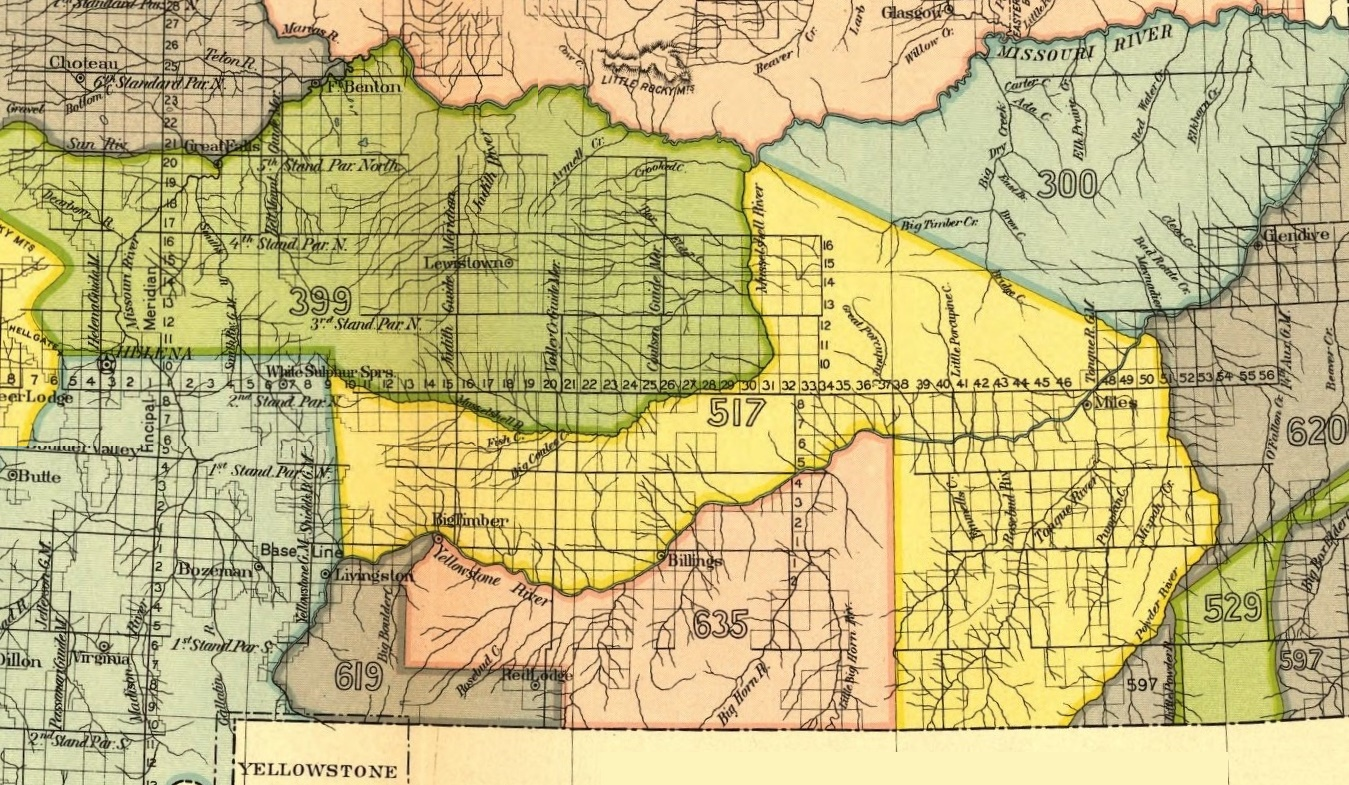
Crow Indian Reservation, 1880 (area 635). Area 619 ceded. Ratified 1882.

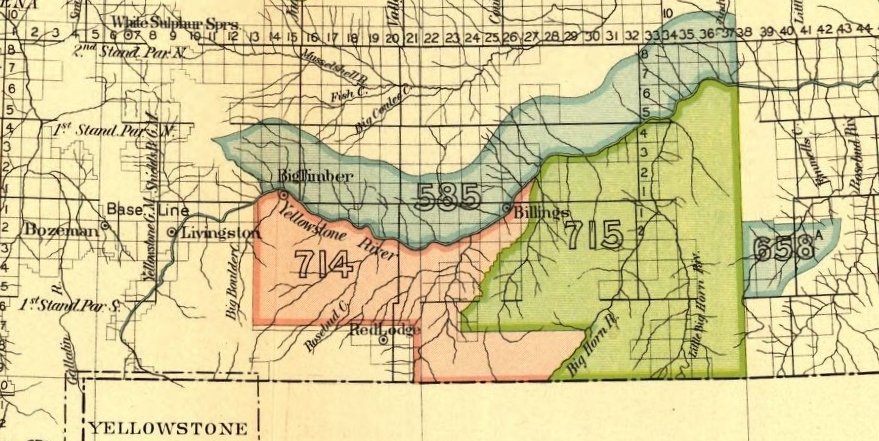
Crow Indian Reservation, 1891 (area 715). Area 714 ceded. Approved 1892. (Area 658 is the Northern Cheyenne Indian Reservation in old Crow territory.)

Modern map of the Crow Indian Reservation and nearby reservations (In Orange).

== Government ==
Frank White Clay became Chairman in 2020. He was re-elected in 2024.

== Economy ==
The value of the enormous amount of coal under the surface in the old tribal territory became clear to the reservation Crows after the Arab Oil Embargo in the 1970s. The Crow Tribe owns 1.4 billion tons of coal, enough to supply the United States for a year. The reservation's Absaloka coal mine provides half of the tribe's nonfederal budget. The single-pit mine opened in 1974 and employs 170 people. The decline of coal mining in the United States has forced the tribe to lay off 1,000 of its 1,300 employees. Every tribal citizen receives a $225 coal payment every four months. Half of the reservation's adult population is unemployed.

In 2013, the tribe and Cloud Peak Energy agreed to open the Big Metal mine, which would have brought the company $10 million in revenue over the first five years. President Barack Obama blocked the mine and then imposed a moratorium on any new coal leasing on public lands. In March 2017, the Northern Cheyenne Indian Reservation sued Interior Secretary Ryan Zinke to stop his attempt to lift the moratorium.

The Crow operate only a small portion of their irrigated or dry farm acreage and about 30 percent of their grazing land. They maintain a bison herd of 300 head.

== Education ==
Little Big Horn College is a community college in Crow Agency.

== Communities ==
- Crow Agency, Montana
- Fort Smith, Montana (part)
- Hardin, Montana (part)
- Lodge Grass, Montana
- Pryor, Montana
- St. Xavier, Montana
- Wyola, Montana

== Historic places and attractions ==
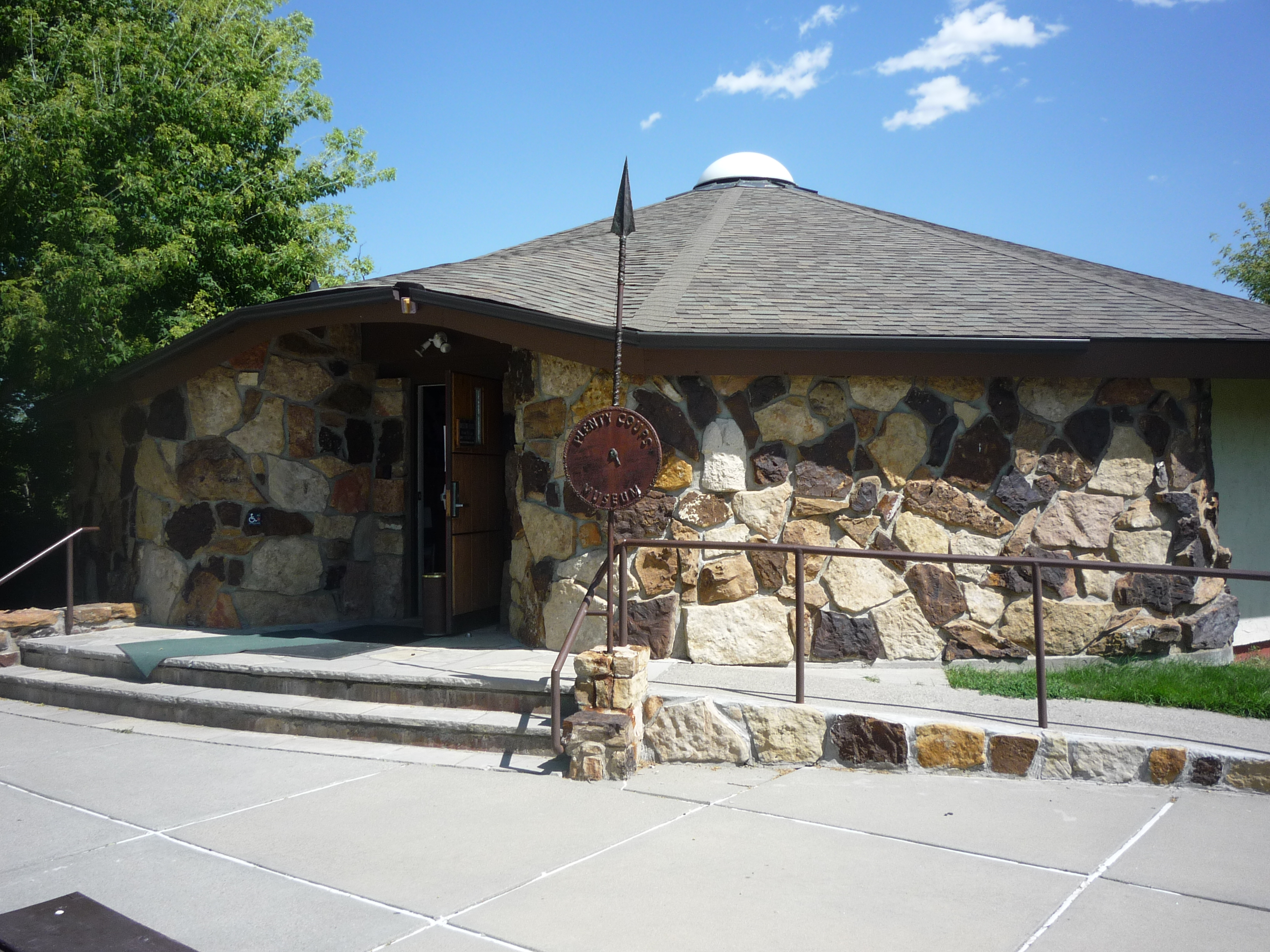
Chief Plenty Coups (Alek-Chea-Ahoosh) State Park and Home museum

The biggest attraction in the reservation is the Little Bighorn National Monument. On June 25, 1876, combined forces from the Lakota, Northern Cheyenne, and Arapaho tribes defeated the Seventh Cavalry Regiment commanded by George Armstrong Custer. Local Crow scouts defending their reservation guided Custer.

Chief Plenty Coups (Alek-Chea-Ahoosh) State Park and Home is located near the town of Pryor. It has a small museum dedicated to Chief Plenty Coups and the Crow Tribe. The chief's two-floor lodge house and grocery store is preserved.

== Notable events ==
Since 1904, the Crow have organized the big Crow Fair, forming the "Teepee Capital of the World". By tradition, it is held the third week in August.

== Popular culture ==
The PBS TV series Reading Rainbow partially filmed its tenth episode, "The Gift of the Sacred Dog", on the reservation on June 17, 1983. The title was based on a book by Paul Goble and was narrated by actor Michael Ansara.
