= Edison Real Bird =

American politician (1929–1981)

Chairman of the Crow Tribe
- In office 1966–1972
- Preceded by: John Wilson
- Succeeded by: David Stewart

Personal details
- Born: October 16, 1929
- Died: August 3, 1981 (aged 51)

Edison Real Bird was the chairman of the Crow Tribe Tribal Council in the United States from 1966 to 1972. While in that position, he implemented several key democratic reforms, and oversaw the election of Pauline Small, the first woman to be elected in the Crow Tribe.

He was photographed at the signing of the Crow Tribal Agreement, with Stewart Udall and Arnold Olsen, in 1961.

"In 1967, during the Edison Real Bird Administration the Crow Cultural Commission, chaired by Henry Old Coyote, began a plan to design the Crow Tribal emblem and flag."

The Crow Central Education Commission of the Crow Tribe of Indians, which was authorized and funded in 1972, "during the Edison Real Bird administration," became the parent organization of today's Little Big Horn College.

The Edison Real Bird Memorial Complex in Crow Agency, Montana, named in his honor, is the site of many events that are a part of Crow Fair.
