= Mitchelene BigMan =

U.S. Army veteran and advocate

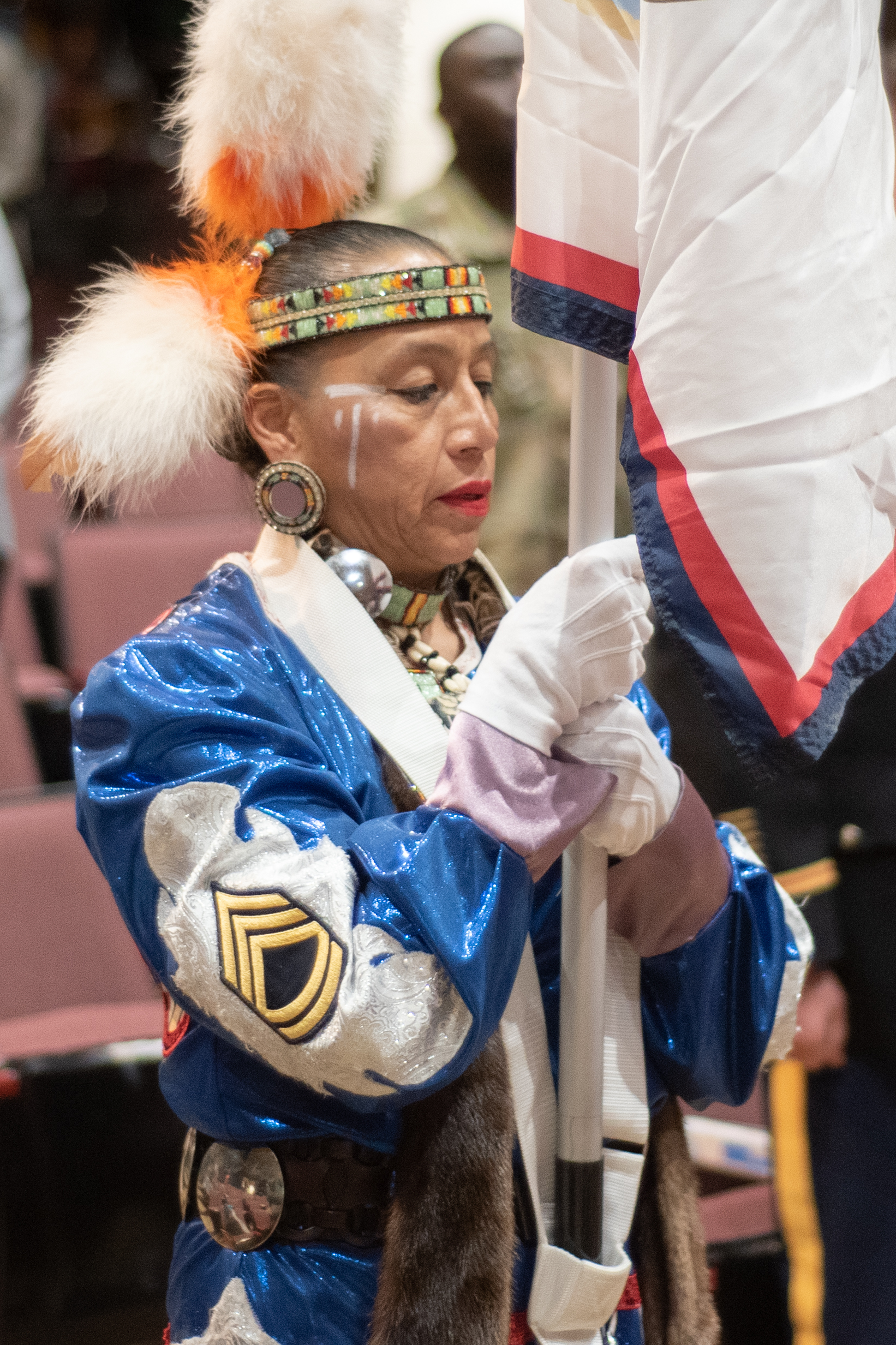
- Mitchelene BigMan performing with the Native American Women Warriors (NAWW) Color Guard in 2019
- Born: September 1, 1965 (age 61); Crow Indian Reservation, Montana, U.S.
- Military career
- Allegiance: United States
- Branch: Army
- Service years: 1987-2009
- Rank: Sergeant First Class (E-7)
- Awards: Combat Action Ribbon, Global War on Terror Service Medal
- Other work: President, Native American Women Warriors
- Website: www.nawwassociation.com

Mitchelene BigMan is an Apsáalooke (Crow/Absaroke) / Minitari (Hidatsa) U.S. Army veteran and advocate, best known for establishing the Native American Women Warriors (NAWW), the first all-female native Color Guard.

== Early life and education ==
BigMan was born on September 1, 1965, in the Montana Crow Reservation, where she was raised on and off, to Ronald BigMan and Edwina Beaumont. She lived at various locations on the reservation in her childhood, primarily residing and attending school between Billings and Lodge Grass, Montana. After a negative experience at one of the reservation's Catholic-run Indian Residential Schools, her family eventually moved to Billings where she graduated from Billings Senior High School in June 1983. She worked as a dockworker and firefighter until April 17, 1987, when she enlisted in the U.S. Army, citing low employment opportunities and high rates of domestic abuse at the reservation as the reasons for her enlistment.

She received a BS in Business Management in 2011 and an MBA in 2013 from the University of Phoenix. Mitchelene pursued a 2nd Masters in Legal Studies of Indigenous Peoples Law from the University of Oklahoma and graduated in May 2023.

== Military service ==
BigMan served as a diesel mechanic for most of her military career, quickly developing a reputation for volunteering for hard or dangerous assignments. After the September 11 terrorist attacks, she deployed to Iraq twice during Operation Iraqi Freedom, including a 2005 tour in which she earned a Combat Action Ribbon after surviving a rocket attack. She retired as a Sergeant First Class on April 30, 2009, after further assignments in Germany, Korea and four stateside duty stations.

== Advocacy ==
During her service BigMan was subjected to racism and discrimination due to her Native American identity and her gender. This discrimination, the domestic violence, and the sexual violence she survived both in and outside of the military would inspire her to create a support network for fellow female veterans of Native American identity, leading to her creating the Army Women's Iraqi Freedom Veterans (AWIFV) Color Guard. The goal of this organization was to provide a support network for female veterans of native identity, celebrating the intersectionality between them while providing these veterans with the ability to carry their ceremonial honors again. The Color Guard is one of the U.S. Armed Forces' most prestigious traditions, as it entails both the safeguarding and the presentation of the United States national flag during ceremonial events.

During the 2010 Denver March pow wow, she coordinated the first all-female native veteran color guard team at the request of ceremony organizers after one of the organizers, Camille Clairmont, notified the arena director Chico Her Many Horses of BigMan's presence and ability to perform in the event. The success of this Color Guard became the basis for BigMan's Native American Women Warriors (NAWW), the modern successor to AWIFV, chartered on March 12, 2010. NAWW's purpose is dedicated to the recognition of women veterans, especially of Native American descent, and their contributions to both the military and indigenous cultures of the United States. The NAWW quickly expanded its team to over 50 members and provided coverage for events across the United States, culminating in the Honor Guard being chosen to perform during Barack Obama's Second Inauguration in 2013 and in Joe Biden's Inauguration in 2021.

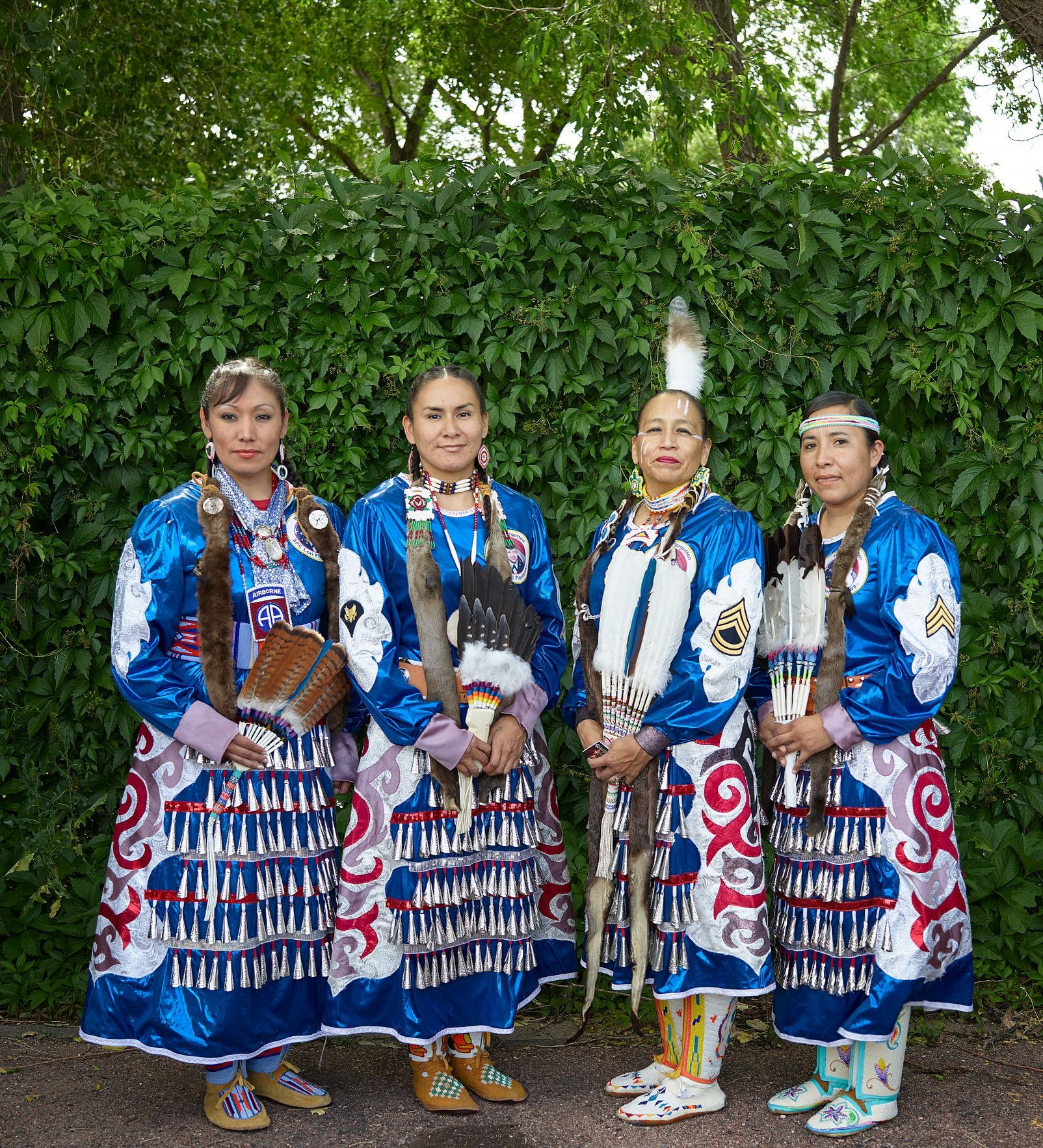
NAWW, dressed in jingle dresses at Barack Obama's second inauguration. BigMan is the second from the right.

BigMan and her team incorporate traditional handmade jingle dresses with their performances, combining the traditional healing and celebratory nature of the dresses with contemporary military symbols and emblems like ranks, deployment patches, or awards. The modern NAWW dress is colored red, white, blue, and Cheyenne pink, symbolizing patriotism and indigenous identity. The jingle dress worn by BigMan during Obama's Second Inauguration also included a tribute to Lori Piestewa, the first Native American woman to die in combat.

== Awards and recognition ==
BigMan was presented the Society of American Indian Government Employees (SAIGE) Meritorious Service Award in 2012 for her efforts in advocacy and representation. She was also honored by the White House "Champions of Change" initiative for her cultural advocacy and for her work with NAWW in 2014.

== Personal life ==
Bigman is married to Dwayne Cyrus, a fellow Army veteran. Together, they have seven children, five of whom were adopted: Marcus Cyrus, Tia Cyrus are the couples own two, Christopher BigMan, Mitcheleen BigMan-Cyrus, Emilia Cyrus, David Cyrus, and Joseph Cyrus are the five adopted. She was also on the Board of Trustees for the Smithsonian National Museum of the American Indian as of October 2018 and the Advisory Committee for the Native American Veterans Memorial.
