= Battle of the Little Bighorn reenactment =

Battle of the Little Bighorn Reenactment is a reenactment of the Battle of the Little Bighorn. Since the 1990s there have been two events conducted annually close to the anniversary of the battle in late June, although in 2015 only one event was scheduled to take place.

== Battle of the Little Bighorn Reenactment ==
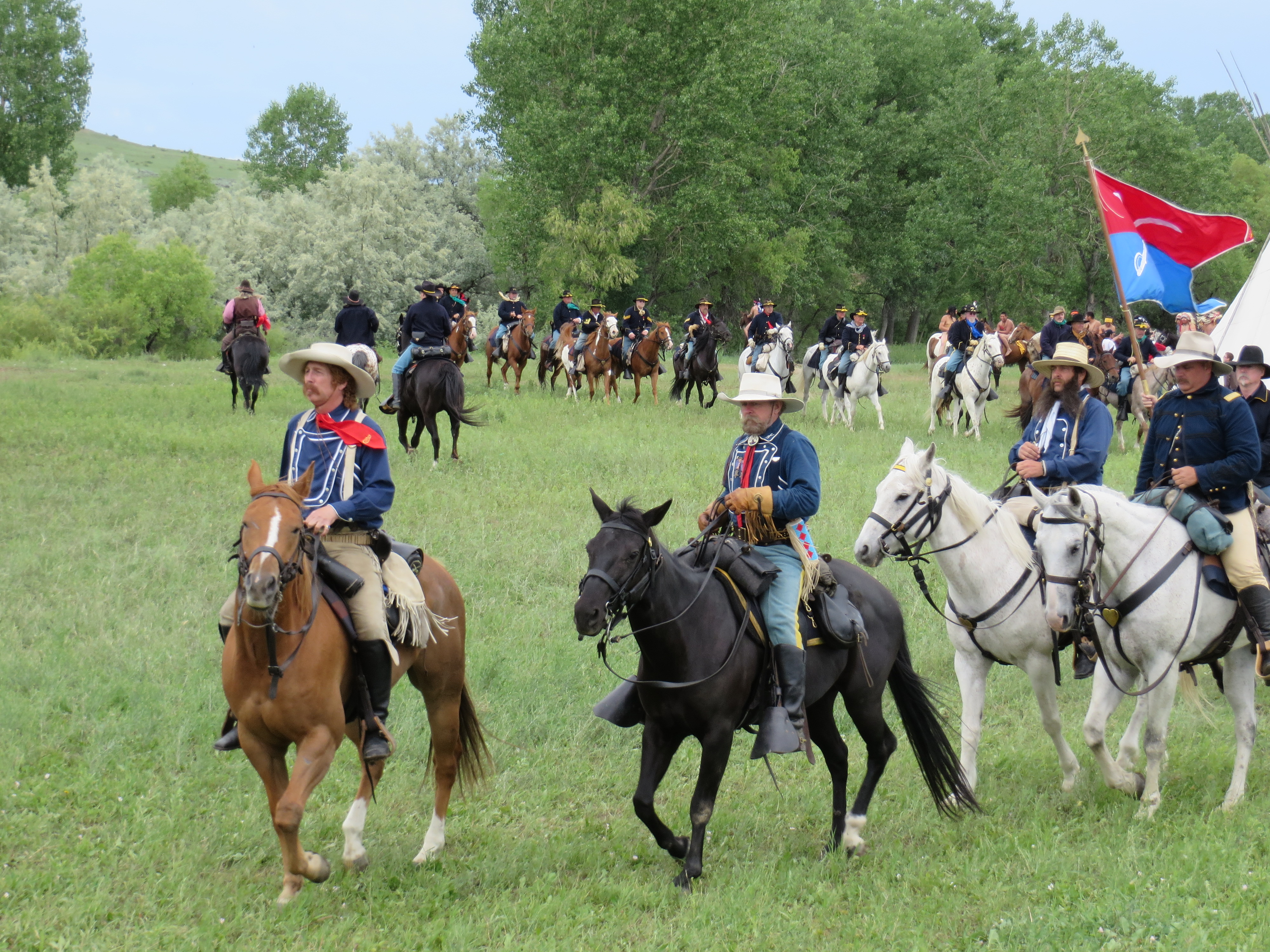
Battle of the Little Bighorn Reenactment 2013

The Real Bird family has conducted the Battle of Little Bighorn Reenactment since 1995 on the banks of the Little Bighorn River off East Frontage Road between Crow Agency and Garryowen, Montana. The site of the reenactment is on the edge of the Little Bighorn river opposite from Medicine Tail Coulee, where fighting may have taken place.

== Custer's Last Stand Reenactment ==
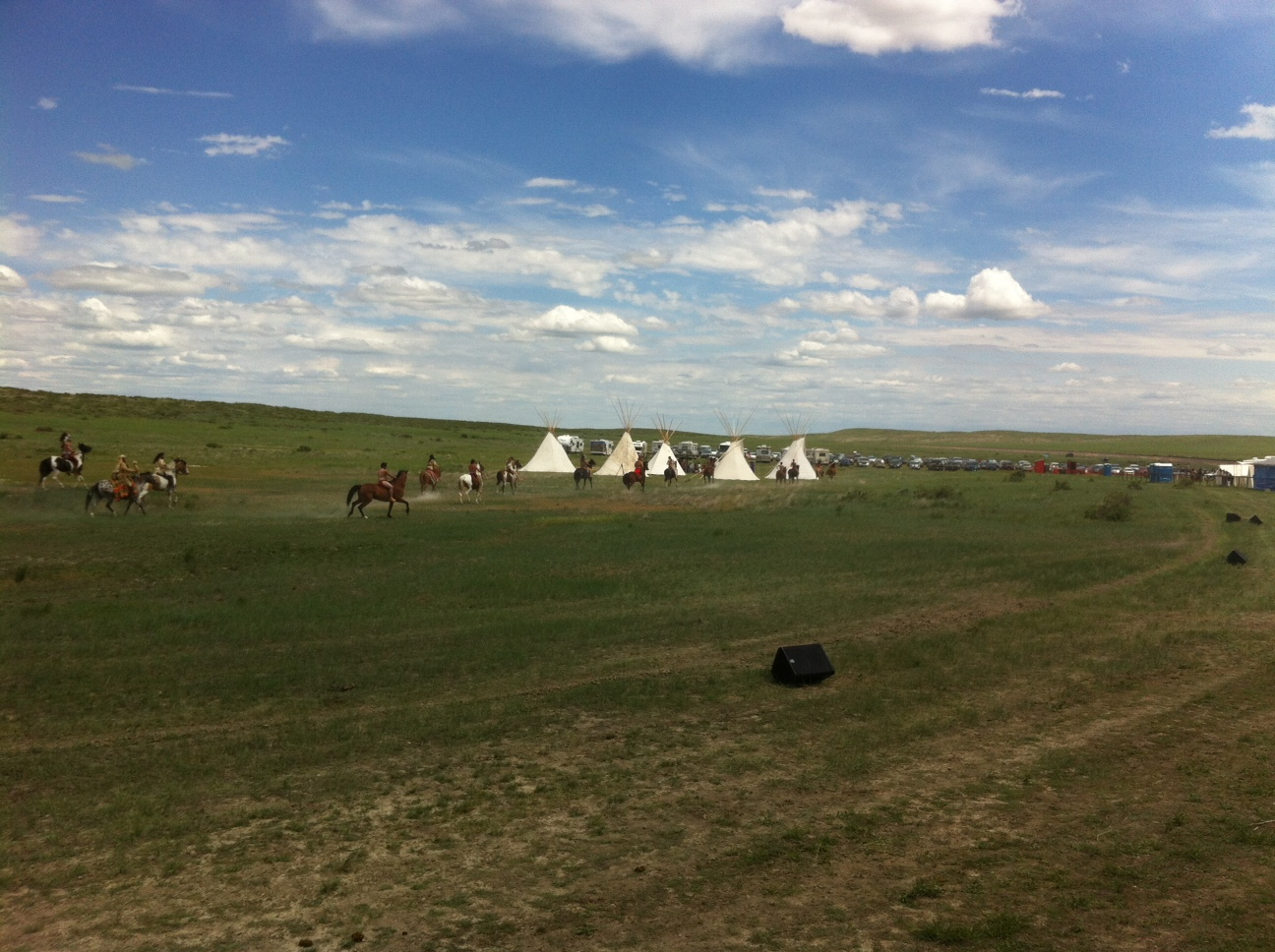
Custer's Last Stand Reenactment 2013

The Hardin Area Chamber of Commerce and Agriculture has annually conducted the Custer's Last Stand Reenactment performed 6 miles outside of Hardin, Montana on Old U.S. Highway 87. Joe Medicine Crow wrote the script for the narrative in 1965, which recounts the significant events leading up to the battle. Although the reenactment had been held annually since the early 1990s, the 2015 event was canceled due to costs, and the 2020 reenactment was cancelled due to the COVID pandemic, a reenactment was scheduled for 2021.

== See also ==
- Battle of the Little Bighorn
