= Robert Yellowtail =

Leader of the Crow Nation

Robert Summers Yellowtail
- Axíchish
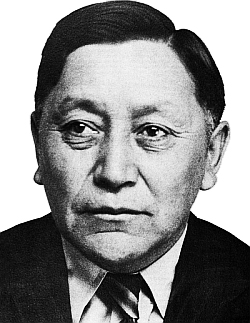

Crow Tribe leader

Personal details
- Born: August 4, 1889 Lodge Grass, Territory of Montana
- Died: June 20, 1988 (aged 98)
- Relations: Thomas Yellowtail (brother); Susie Walking Bear Yellowtail (sister-in-law)
- Known for: Leadership of the Crow Tribe

Robert Summers Yellowtail (Crow: Axíchish, August 4, 1889 – June 20, 1988) was a leader of the Crow Tribe. Described as a "20th-century warrior", Yellowtail was the first Native American to hold the post of Agency Superintendent at a reservation.

== Early life and education ==
Yellowtail was born in Lodge Grass, Montana in 1889. Throughout his life, Yellowtail went by three Crow names. He was referred to as Bíawakshish, or "Summer", then Shoopáaheesh, or "Four War Deeds", and finally Axíchish, or "The Wet", which was shared with another war chief who was in the same clan as Yellowtail. Separated from his mother at the age of 4 years old, Yellowtail was culturally assimilated into a reservation boarding school. When he was 13 years old, he went to the Sherman Institute, in Riverside, California, graduating in 1907. He then attended the Extension Law School in Los Angeles, transferring to the University of Chicago Law School, where he gained his Juris Doctor degree.

== Personal life ==
Yellowtail was married four times. In 1911, he married a daughter of Spotted Horse, and after she died during the 1920's, he then married Lillian Bull Shows. His second marriage ended in divorce, and in 1932, he married his late wife, Margaret Picket. After which in 1960, he entered his fourth marriage to Dorothy Payne.

Yellowtail has seven children and many grandchildren. One grandson, Cary Morin, is a singer-songwriter.

== Political activism ==
In 1910 Yellowtail was enlisted by Crow chief Plenty Coups to defend the Crow Indian Reservation against a bill sponsored by Montana Senator Thomas J. Walsh that sought to open the reservation to homesteading. The bill was defeated after seven years of work in Washington. Yellowtail's first official position, in 1912, was as a district representative on a tribal business committee where he negotiated grazing leases and gave the tribe a voice during land disputes. Initially, Yellowtail was in this committee to fight disputes related to Crow land, but caught the attention of other political leaders like Plenty Coups. Less than a year later he made his first trip to Washington D.C. He attended the National Indian Memorial in New York City as an interpreter for Medicine Crow, Plenty Coups and other leaders. In 1920, he helped to draft the "Crow Allotment Act" that protected Crow lands, and was instrumental in obtaining voting rights for Native Americans in 1924. From 1934 until 1945, Yellowtail was the Superintendent of the Crow Indian Reservation, the first superintendent to administer his own tribe. During this time, Yellowtail was able to get white ranchers to return 40,000 acres of land to the tribe, built a Crow Hospital, brought horses and cattle from Canada, and buffalo from Yellowstone National Park. He also demanded a better physician for the Crow Indian Hospital and advocated for the hospital to be staffed by Crow personnel.

Yellowtail was a leading figure in the opposition to a dam on the Bighorn River in the southern portion of the reservation. The dam would flood the Bighorn Canyon, sacred to the Crow. Yellowtail was unable to prevent the dam's construction, which began in 1961, but won a modest increase in compensation to the tribe after a divisive fight. In a final irony, Yellowtail Dam was named after Yellowtail. Yellowtail continued to fight for compensation for the Crow people in the 1980s, arguing against sales of coal from reservation mineral rights controlled by the Bureau of Indian Affairs.

Yellowtail was the subject of a 1985 video, Contrary Warriors: A Story of the Crow Tribe.
