= Carl Venne =

Crow Nation leader (1946–2009)

- Aashiise Dakatak Baacheitchish
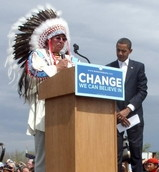
- Crow Tribal Chairman Carl Venne and Barack Obama at Apsaalooke Veterans Park in Crow Agency, Montana, on May 19, 2008.

Chairman of the Crow Tribe
- In office November 12, 2002 – February 15, 2009
- Preceded by: Vincent Goes Ahead
- Succeeded by: Cedric Black Eagle

Personal details
- Born: July 20, 1946 Helena, Montana
- Died: February 15, 2009 (aged 62) Hardin, Montana

Carl Venne (July 20, 1946 – February 15, 2009), whose Crow name was Aashiise Dakatak Baacheitchish, was, until his death, the chairman of the executive branch of the Crow Tribe. He won a November 2002 special election held after the September 2002 resignation of Chairman Clifford Birdinground. Venne was sworn into office on November 12, 2002. He served until his death on February 15, 2009. Venne served on the Montana Meth Project and Advisory Council of the State of Montana Department of Corrections. Notably, he campaigned with the Barack Obama presidential campaign in 2008, welcoming him to Crow County as part of Obama's campaign tour.

Venne died on February 15, 2009, aged 62. He had two daughters and one son. He served with the US Army during the Vietnam War.
