= Pauline Small =

American politician (1924–2005)

- Strikes Twice In One Summer
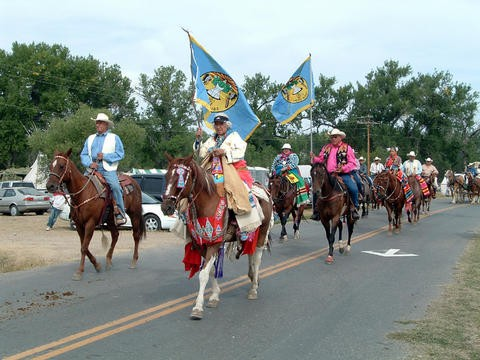
- Pauline Small on horseback. She carries the flag of the Crow Tribe of Montana. As the first female official, she is entitled to carry the flag during the Crow Fair Parade.

Vice-Secretary of the Crow Tribal Council
- In office 1966–1972

Lodge Grass Board of Trustees

Crow Tribal Education Committee

107th Committee of the Crow Tribal Council
- In office 1996–2000

Personal details
- Born: Pauline White Man Runs Him; November 30, 1924 Crow Indian Reservation, Lodge Grass, Montana
- Died: March 9, 2005 (aged 80)
- Spouse(s): Ivan James Small, Sr., Northern Cheyenne
- Relations: Grandfather, White Man Runs Him; cousin, Joe Medicine Crow
- Parent(s): Blake and Florence Annie Blaine Whitemanrunshim
- Education: Haskell Indian College, Sheridan Business College
- Known for: First woman to be elected to office in the Crow Tribe

Pauline Small (November 30, 1924 – March 9, 2005) was the first woman to be elected to office in the Crow Tribe of Montana. In 1966 she was elected to Vice-Secretary of the Crow Tribal Council, holding office de facto to 1972, and served in various positions within the Crow Tribal Offices, many to do with supporting education.

== Early life and education ==
Pauline White Man Runs Him was born on the Crow Indian Reservation in Lodge Grass, Montana. The youngest of three children, she was raised in the Valley of the Chiefs district on the reservation. Small was a granddaughter of White Man Runs Him.

== Marriage and family ==
She married Ivan James Small, Sr., a member of the Northern Cheyenne Tribe of Indians. They made their home in Busby, Montana. Eventually they moved to the family allotment of Packs The Hat in the Rotten Grass area.

== Tribal politics ==
Small was active in Crow tribal politics. In 1966 she was elected to the position of Vice-Secretary of the Tribal Council, the first woman to hold any office. She served in that position until 1972, and has been active on various committees of the Tribal council.

Deeply interested in education, she was a member of the Lodge Grass Board of Trustees, serving as Chair for eight years; Crow Tribal Education Committee; and the 107th Committee of the Crow Tribal Council. A member of the Crow Tribe, she was very involved with tribal government. Small was an active supporter of Indian rodeo for 30 years.

== See also ==
- List of Native American politicians
- Native American women in politics
