= Tuff Harris =

American football player (born 1983)

No. 35, 26
- Position: Safety

Personal information
- Born: January 23, 1983 (age 43); Crow Agency, Montana, U.S.
- Listed height: 6 ft 0 in (1.83 m)
- Listed weight: 198 lb (90 kg)

Career information
- High school: Lodge Grass (Lodge Grass, Montana); Colstrip (Colstrip, Montana)
- College: Montana (2002–2006)
- NFL draft: 2007: undrafted

Career history
- Miami Dolphins (2007); New Orleans Saints (2008)*; Tennessee Titans (2008); Pittsburgh Steelers (2009–2010); Edmonton Eskimos (2011)
- * Offseason or practice squad member only

Awards and highlights
- 2× All-Big Sky (2005-2006)

Career NFL statistics
- Total tackles: 8
- Stats at Pro Football Reference

Tuff Chester David Harris (born January 23, 1983) is an American former professional football player who was a safety in the National Football League (NFL). He was signed by the Miami Dolphins as an undrafted free agent in 2007. He played college football for the Montana Grizzlies from 2003 to 2006.

Harris was also a member of the New Orleans Saints, Tennessee Titans, Miami Dolphins, and Edmonton Eskimos.

== Early life ==
Harris was born in Crow Agency, Montana. He grew up in Lodge Grass, Montana, also known as the Valley of the Chiefs. He is a member of the Crow Nation. His parents, Jerry and Melody Harris, excelled in track and helped to coach at Lodge Grass High School. His sister Jerilyn Harris was a state champion in the 100, 200 and 400 meter dashes.

During his years at Lodge Grass High School, Harris played football, basketball, baseball, and ran track. His mother was an assistant coach for the track and field team.

Harris's family moved to Colstrip after his sophomore year. After moving from Lodge Grass to Colstrip, Harris continued playing football, basketball, and track for the Colstrip Colts. In 2001, Tuff set an all-class Montana high school state record in the 100-meter dash.

== College career ==
After graduating in 2002, Harris went to school at the University of Montana and was a four-year starter at cornerback for the Grizzlies and set school and Big Sky Conference records as a punt returner (including longest return, most return yards in one game, and most yards in a season).

== Professional career ==
=== Miami Dolphins ===
After going undrafted in the 2007 NFL draft, Harris was signed by the Miami Dolphins as an undrafted free agent on May 3. He was waived during final cuts on September 1 and re-signed to the team's practice squad, where he remained until being promoted to the active roster on November 14. He made his NFL debut in the regular season finale against the Cincinnati Bengals on December 30.

Harris was waived by the Dolphins the following offseason on April 24, 2008.

=== New Orleans Saints ===
The New Orleans Saints signed Harris on May 27, 2008. He was released by the team on July 30 due to ankle injuries.

=== Tennessee Titans ===
Harris was signed by the Tennessee Titans on August 19, 2008. He was waived on August 29 and re-signed to the team's practice squad on September 1. Harris was signed from the practice squad to the active roster on November 22 after cornerbacks Reynaldo Hill and Eric King were placed on injured reserve.

The Titans waived Harris on September 4, 2009.

=== Pittsburgh Steelers ===
Harris was signed to the Pittsburgh Steelers practice squad on September 7, 2009. He was signed to active roster on January 6, 2010. Pittsburgh waived Harris on August 8, 2010.

== Personal life ==
Tuff is married to Mary (Hasselberg) Harris. Mary is from Staples, Minnesota. The two met while Mary was playing golf at the University of Montana and Tuff was on the football team. Tuff is an enrolled member of the Apsaalooke Nation (Crow Tribe) and is also of Northern Cheyenne descent. He played with deering Junior high football he played with the Springfield family in Lodge Grass Montana.
