= Janine Pease =

American Indian (Crow) educator and advocate

- Born: Janine Windy Boy; Colville Indian Reservation, Washington, U.S.
- Education: Central Washington University (BA, BA); Montana State University (MA, PhD)
- Awards: MacArthur Fellowship

Janine Pease is an American educator and Native American advocate. She is the founding president of the Little Big Horn College as well as the past president of the American Indian Higher Education Consortium and director of the American Indian College Fund. She was appointed by President Bill Clinton to the National Advisory Council on Indian Education and the White House Initiative on Tribal Colleges and Universities Advisory Council. She has also served as a trustee of the Smithsonian National Museum of the American Indian.

Pease (then Janine Windy Boy) was the lead plaintiff in a voting rights litigation against Big Horn County (Windy Boy v. Big Horn County), the result of which was a Federal District Court ruling that invalidated at large elections in Big Horn County and the local school district. This was the first successful Voting Rights Act case on behalf of American Indians. She also served on the Montana Human Rights Commission.

== Early life and education ==
Pease is a member of the Crow Indian tribe. She was born on the Colville Indian Reservation in Washington where both of her parents worked as educators. She was the first woman of Crow lineage to earn a doctorate degree, from Montana State University in 1994. One of her paternal great-grandfathers was White Man Runs Him, one of the Crow scouts who served with George Armstrong Custer. Pease holds two bachelor's degrees from Central Washington University. She received her master's from Montana State University in 1987 and her doctorate in adult and higher education in 1994.

== Career ==
Pease has worked for the Governor's Commission on Youth Involvement and in 1975 she served as the Director of the Crow tribe's Adult and Continuing Education Program. She was part of the Crow Central Education Commission and helped to establish the first Crow Indian educational authority, which provided for the education of tribe members on and off the reservation. Pease taught Native American Studies at Big Bend Community College. She was also a counselor at the Navajo Community College and Eastern Montana College (now Montana State University). Pease served as the president of the Little Big Horn College from 1982 to 2000. From 2003 to 2008 she held the position of Vice President for American Indian Affairs at Rocky Mountain College. Currently she works as the Vice President for Academic Affairs at Fort Peck Community College in Poplar, Montana.

Pease is interested in revitalization of the Crow language.

== Recognition ==
Pease is the recipient of several prestigious awards and honors including the MacArthur Fellowship and the ACLU Jeannette Rankin Award, as well as being chosen as the National Indian Educator of the Year in 1990. She was also named "one of the 100 Most Influential Montanans of the Century" by the Missoulian Magazine.

She is the recipient of several honorary doctorates and was appointed to the Montana Board of Regents of Higher Education in 2006 by Governor Schweitzer. In 2006, Governor Schweitzer appointed her to the Montana University System Board of Regents, where she served from May 2006 to February 2011.

== Bibliography ==
- The Essential Charles Eastman (Ohiyesa) (World Wisdom, 2007) ISBN 978-1-933316-33-8 [introduction]
- Native Spirit: The Sun Dance Way (World Wisdom, 2007) ISBN 978-1-933316-27-7 [contributor]
- Native Spirit and The Sun Dance Way DVD (World Wisdom, 2007)
- The Spirit of Indian Women (World Wisdom, 2005) [foreword] ISBN 978-0-941532-87-7
- Light on the Indian World: The Essential Writings of Charles Eastman (World Wisdom, 2002) ISBN 978-0-941532-30-3 [introduction]
