= Cary Morin =

- Born: Cary Lewis Morin; Billings, Montana, U.S.
- Education: Charles M. Russell High School
- Occupations: Singer; songwriter; musician
- Years active: 1978–present
- Spouse: Celeste Di Iorio
- Children: 3
- Relatives: Robert Yellowtail (grandfather); Thomas Yellowtail (great-uncle)
- Musical career
- Genres: Rock; Native Americana; folk; blues; reggae; R&B; Cajun
- Formerly of: The Atoll; Young Ancients; Pura Fé Trio
- Website: carymorin.com

Cary Lewis Morin is an American singer, songwriter, and musician based in Fort Collins, Colorado. His album Dockside Saints, released in 2021, peaked at #7 on the Roots Music Report's Top 50 Colorado Album Chart. His accolades include an Independent Music Award and two Indigenous Music Awards for Best Blues Album. Morin's songs were featured in Resident Alien and Earl Biss - The Spirit Who Walks Among His People. He has performed at the Lincoln Center, The Kennedy Center, the 2010 Vancouver Olympics, and Paris Jazz Festival, and he has toured the US and internationally.

== Early life ==
Cary Lewis Morin was born in Billings, Montana and grew up in Great Falls, Montana before moving to Northern Colorado. His father, Leslie Morin, was an Air Force officer and his mother, Anita (née Yellowtail) Morin, was an artist. A grandson of Robert Yellowtail, Morin is an enrolled member of the Crow tribe and is also Assiniboine with Black ancestry.

Morin took piano lessons as a child and began playing guitar at age 10. He played in local country, rock, and bluegrass bands as a teenager. He taught pottery workshops as a senior studio student at CMR High School, and graduated from high school in 1981. In 1989, he formed a three-piece dance band, The Atoll, who were featured on Denver's KMGH-TV as the "Best of Colorado."

== Career ==
Morin is known for his acoustic picking style. His musical style has been characterized as "acoustic Native Americana" with elements of bluegrass, blues, jazz, reggae, and dance. Morin performs both as a solo artist and as a member of the Young Ancients, the Cary Morin Duo, and the band Cary Morin & Ghost Dog; his wife, Celeste Di Iorio, also performs in the latter two groups. He is a former member of the Pura Fé Trio and The Atoll. His musical influences include Neil Young, Bob Marley, and Jimi Hendrix.

Morin received a Lifetime Achievement Award from the Fort Collins Music Association and has received fellowship awards from First Peoples Fund and the National Artist Fellowship. NPR Music named his live performance of "Jug In The Water" as one of its best live sessions of 2020.

He has toured the US, France, Denmark, Japan, Belgium, Germany, the UK, Italy, Spain, and Switzerland. He has performed at the 2010 Vancouver Olympics, Paris Jazz Festival, Folk Alliance International, and the Kerrville Folk Festival. On stage, Morin performed in Tribe at the Celebrity Theater and as a guest performer with Kodō. He co-authored Turtle Island, a 50-member stage production that played two consecutive years to sold-out audiences in Northern Colorado.

== Awards ==
Morin has been nominated for Aboriginal Entertainer of the Year and Best Blues CD in the Aboriginal Peoples' Choice Music Awards.

Year	Award	Category	Nominee	Result	Ref.
2013	Colorado Blues Challenge	Solo Championship	Cary Morin	Won	
2014	Colorado Blues Challenge	Solo Championship	Cary Morin	Won	
2014	Colorado Blues Society	Best Solo/Duo	Cary Morin	Won	
2014	Fort Collins Music Association Peer Awards	Lifetime Achievement Award	Cary Morin	Won	
2015	Fort Collins Music Association Peer Awards	Best Blues/Jazz	Cary Morin	Won	
2015	Colorado Blues Society	Favorite Blues Singer Male	Cary Morin	Won	
2015	Colorado Blues Society	Favorite Songwriter	Cary Morin	Won	
2015	Colorado Blues Society	Favorite Acoustic Act	Cary Morin	Won	
2016	Colorado Blues Society	Favorite Songwriter	Cary Morin	Won	
2016	Fort Collins Music Association Peer Awards	Best Blues/Jazz	Cary Morin	Won	
2017	Indigenous Music Awards	Best Blues CD	Cradle to the Grave	Won	
2018	Fort Collins Music Association Peer Awards	Best Blues	Cary Morin	Won	
2018	Independent Music Awards	Best Blues Album	Cradle to the Grave	Won	
2019	Fort Collins Music Association Peer Awards	Best Blues	Cary Morin	Won	
2019	Indigenous Music Awards	Best Blues Album	When I Rise	Won	
2019	The Telly Awards	General-Music Bronze Winner	When I Rise	Won	
2019	Telluride Blues & Brews Festival	Telluride Blues Challenge	Cary Morin	Won	
2023	Fort Collins Music Association Peer Awards	Best Established Band/Artist	Cary Morin	Won	

== Discography ==
- 1993 - Circle of Friends
- 1999 - Acoustic Turtle Island
- 2012 - Sing it Louder
- 2013 - Streamline
- 2014 - Tiny Town
- 2016 - Together
- 2017 - Cradle to the Grave
- 2018 - When I Rise
- 2020 - Dockside Saints
- 2024 - Innocent Allies

=== with The Atoll ===
- 1993 - Dream Marquee: Live at Lindens

=== with The Young Ancients ===
- 2015 - Fishstory
