= Frank White Clay =

Incumbent chairman of the Crow Indian Reservation since 2020

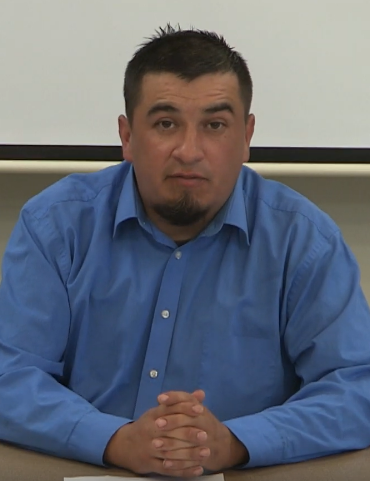
- Frank White Clay in 2020

25th Chair of the Crow Tribe
- Incumbent
- Assumed office November 18th, 2020
- Preceded by: Alvin Not Afraid Jr.

Personal details
- Born: Crow Agency, Montana, United States
- Party: Independent

Frank White Clay is a Crow politician, an independent, who has served as the incumbent chairman of the Crow Indian Reservation since 2020.

== Political career ==
Frank White Clay was elected to tribal leadership for the first time in 2015, as a senator in the Crow Legislature from Black Lodge District. In November 2020, White Clay ran for the position of Chair of the Crow Tribe, his campaign promised to improve the governments fiscal transparency and increasing response to the COVID-19 pandemic, he won a landslide victory against incumbent Alvin Not Afraid Jr. His inauguration was held on December 8, 2020, and was live streamed by the tribe on Facebook. Amid his electoral victory, the Crow Tribe Executive Branch faced a large budget deficit estimated at 80 million dollars.

Weeks prior to his election, the Crow Tribal government had dissolved its tribal police force, which had been formed five months prior.

On February 9, 2021, White Clay collaborated with other tribal leaders from Montana to protest Montana House Bill 241, which intended to revise hunting laws on Indian Reservations. White Clay described the bill as an "attack on tribal sovereignty".

Following the inauguration of Joe Biden, in 2021, White Clay released a statement in favor of the president's appointment of Deb Haaland to the position of Secretary of the Interior. Later that year, White Clay met with United States senator from Montana Steve Daines to discuss providing support to tribal law enforcement. In 2023, he met with senator Jon Tester to collaborate on construction of water systems, following Joe Biden's implementation of the Indian Water Rights Settlement Completion Fund.

White Clay was re-elected in 2024. He ran in a slate with the other incumbent members of the executive branch. He received 2,119 votes to 1,224 for Cody Chiefchild Meeks.

== Electoral history ==
2020 Crow Tribal Chair Election
Party	Candidate	Votes	%
Independent	Frank White Clay	1,978	94%
Independent	Alvin Not Afraid Jr.	143	6%
Total votes		2,121	100%
