= Richard Real Bird =

Politician of the Crow Tribe

Richard Real Bird is a Crow politician and former chairman of the Crow Tribe of Montana. Real Bird served as chairman of the Crow Tribe for two terms, from 1986 until 1990.

Real Bird was convicted of fraud and embezzlement while in office. He lost his 1990 re-election bid to Crow Nation secretary Clara Nomee, who succeeded him.
