= Clifford Birdinground =

American politician

Chairman of the Crow Tribe
- In office 2000 – September 2002
- Preceded by: Clara Nomee
- Succeeded by: Vincent Goes Ahead Jr.

Clifford Birdinground is an American politician and member of the Crow Tribe of Montana. Birdinground served as the Chairman of the Crow Tribe from 2000 to 2002.

Birdinground's predecessor, former Chairwoman Clara Nomee, was indicted in 1997 convicted of felony theft of tribal land in September 1998. However, her conviction did not prohibit her from holding tribal office. She ran for re-election for a sixth term in 2000. However, Birdinground won the May 2000 election, defeating Nomee with 67% of the vote.

Birdinground took office in 2000. Upon taking office, Birdinground canceled all deals and transactions made by the Nomee administration following her 1997 indictment. He also fired approximately 130 tribal government employees.

Birdinground pleaded guilty to one count of bribery in U.S. federal court in 2002, and resigned from office in a letter of resignation dated September 5, 2002. He was sentenced to 37 months in prison in September 2003 and, after a series of appeals, was ordered to begin serving his sentence January 4, 2007, at the Florence Federal Correctional Complex in Colorado.

Birdinground was succeeded by interim Crow Vice Chairman Vincent Goes Ahead Jr. upon his resignation in September 2002. Goes Ahead, who had been elected vice chairman in 2000, ran for the special election to complete the remainder of Birdinground's unexpired term in November 2002. However, Goes Ahead was defeated in the election by Carl Venne. Venne received 1,589 votes to win, while Goes Ahead received 1,481 votes. Venne was sworn in as Birdinground's permanent successor on November 12, 2002. Goes Ahead remained Vice Chairman until his term expired in 2004.
