= Vincent Goes Ahead =

American politician

Vincent Goes Ahead Jr.

Acting Chairman of the Crow Tribe
- In office September 2002 – November 2002
- Preceded by: Clifford Birdinground
- Succeeded by: Carl Venne

Vincent Goes Ahead Jr. is an American politician and Crow Tribe tribal leader of Montana. Goes Ahead served as the acting Chairman of the Crow Tribe from September to November 2002 following the resignation of his predecessor, former Chairman Clifford Birdinground, due to a bribery indictment.

Goes Ahead was elected Vice Chairman of the Crow Tribe in May 2000. He became acting Chairman of the Crow Tribe once Clifford Birdinground resigned from office in a letter of resignation dated September 5, 2002.

Goes Ahead ran for a special election to complete the remainder of Birdinground's unexpired term. However, Goes Ahead was defeated in the election by Carl Venne. Venne received 1,589 votes to win, while Goes Ahead received 1,481 votes. Venne was sworn in as Birdinground's successor on November 12, 2002. Goes Ahead remained Vice Chairman until his term expired in 2004.

Goes Ahead has served as Vice-Chairman of the Friends of Plenty Coups Association.
