= Crow Fair =

Festival of the Crow peoples

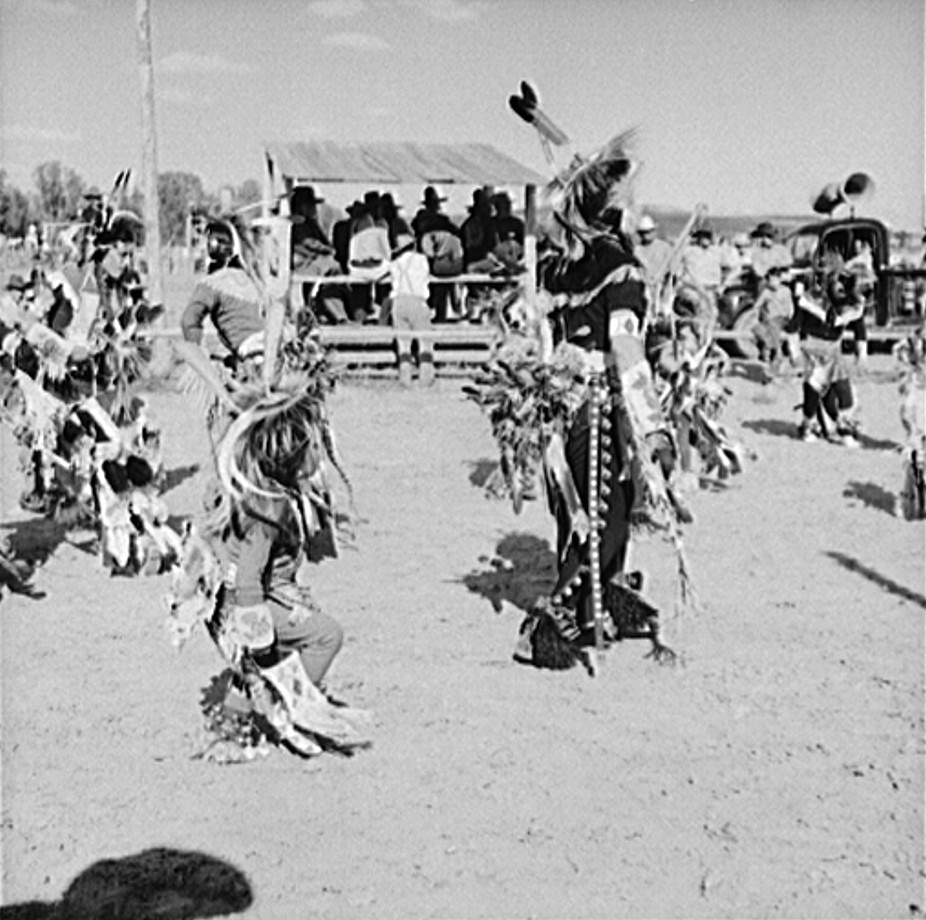
Dancers at Crow Fair in 1941

The Crow Fair (Crow: Chichiáxxaawasuua) was created in 1904 by Crow leaders and an Indian government agent to present the Crow Tribe of Montana as culturally distinct and modern peoples, in an entrepreneurial venue. It welcomes all Native American tribes of the Great Plains to its festivities, functioning as a "giant family reunion under the Big Sky." Indeed, it is currently the largest Northern Native American gathering, attracting nearly 45,000 spectators and participants. Crow Fair is "the teepee capital of the world, over 1,500 teepees in a giant campground," according to 2011 Crow Fair General Manager Austin Little Light.

Held annually the third week of August on land surrounding the Little Big Horn River near Billings, Montana, Crow Fair is very similar to a County Fair. It serves as a venue for the display of the region's arts and culture, from craft jewelry for sale to physical feats of dance.

== The Parade ==
The Crow Fair traditionally includes its own unique version of a parade.

The parade begins each morning of the Fair at ten o'clock. The Color Guard leads the parade with retired veterans and active members of the armed services. Following the Color Guard are the President, Vice-President, and First Vice-President of the Crow Fair. The President carries the American Flag. In the past, the royalty of the Crow Tribe would follow the Presidents; however, in modern parades the Crow Tribal Officials replace Crow royalty.

The majority of participants in the parade are essentially members of the Crow Tribe, dressed in traditional wear with eagle feathers, warbonnets, old-time saddles, western saddles, reservation hats, and extravagant beadwork. The beadwork of the Crow Tribe is among the most technically proficient in the world.

The parade takes place on Friday, Saturday, and Sunday of the Crow Fair. The Sunday parade involves the greatest number of participants, and may extend as long as 1.5 miles in length.

== Dance Celebration ==
Crow Fair hosts one of several Dance Celebrations. The Crow Dance Celebration, commonly known as a pow-wow, is held every late afternoon and evening during the fair. The Crow Tribe makes the distinction that dancing is the most fundamental form of celebration, as members may come to the dance arena simply for the pure joy elicited by dancing. However, pow-wows do often involve competition dancing.

== Rodeo ==
The Crow Fair Rodeo is sponsored annually by the Crow Tribe. The rodeo is a daily feature at the Crow Fair, offering a full day's entertainment of youth events, professional Indian cowboys and cowgirls, and horse racing. The Northern Plains Indian Rodeo Association, organized under the Indian National Finals Rodeo, is the current association that sanctions the rodeo event.

The Crow Fair Rodeo is held at the Edison Real Bird Memorial Complex, in Crow Agency, Montana. The rodeo arena, race track, stables, and campgrounds are all part of this complex.

== Committee ==
On the last day of the Crow Fair week, the Crow Tribe annually elects a new committee to organize the next Crow Fair Dance Celebration, Rodeo, and Racemeet. The Tuesday morning and afternoon is filled with camp criers and announcers telling the campgrounds via megaphone of the candidates. Campcriers are hired by candidates to notify the campground of their candidacy. Often, rumors are flying before and during the Crow Fair regarding which individuals will run for election for the committee.
