= Clara Nomee =

American politician and tribal leader

- Xooxaashe iisaashe itshe

Chair of the Crow Tribe
- In office 1990–2000
- Preceded by: Richard Real Bird
- Succeeded by: Clifford Birdinground

Personal details
- Born: May 12, 1938 Crow Agency, Montana, U.S.
- Died: January 31, 2012 (aged 73) Billings, Montana, U.S.
- Spouse: Carlton Nomee
- Education: Sheridan College; Bacone College

Clara Mae White Hip Nomee (Crow: Xooxaashe iisaashe itshe; May 12, 1938 – January 31, 2012) was an Crow politician and tribal leader who served as the chairwoman of the Crow Tribe of Montana for five-terms from 1990 to 2000. Nomee was the first woman to hold the chairmanship of the Crow Tribe.

== Biography ==
=== Personal life ===
Clara Nomee was born on May 12, 1938, in Crow Agency, Montana, to parents, Henry Pretty On Top, Sr. and Susie White Hip. Her parents gave her the Crow name of Xooxaashe iisaashe itshe, meaning "Good Corn Stock". She was raised in the vicinity of Lodge Grass, Montana, and graduated from Lodge Grass High School. Nomee attended Sheridan Business College and Bacone College in Oklahoma. Both her parents died in 1976. She drank heavily for the following two years, before forgoing alcohol permanently in 1978.

Nomee married her second husband, Carlton Nomee Sr., in 1985 at a ceremony in Sheridan, Wyoming. The couple settled in Lodge Grass, Montana. She had no children, but raised twelve family members.

Nomee worked for Bureau of Indian Affairs, an agency of the federal government of the United States, at its local offices in Browning and Crow Agency for thirty years before her retirement. She also served on the Lodge Grass High School board of trustees for eight years.

=== Chairwoman of the Crow Tribe ===
Nomee became involved in politics when her husband, Carlton Nomee Sr., became vice chairman of the Crow Tribe. Clara Nomee served as the secretary of the Crow Tribe for one term from 1988 to 1990.

Several of Nomee's predecessors had been indicted or impeached for criminal behavior. Her immediate predecessor, former Chairman Richard Real Bird, had been convicted for embezzlement and fraud.

Nomee decided to run for Chairperson of the Crow Tribe in 1990. She encountered difficulties and a tribal glass ceiling during her first campaign, telling the Billings Gazette in 1992, "When I first ran, men said my place was at home, raising children and taking care of the husband." Nomee won the election on May 12, 1990, becoming the first woman to lead the Crow Tribe. She would serve for five, two-year terms in office between 1990 and 2000.

Nomee was one of just six Native American leaders selected to meet with officials of the Clinton administration in Washington, D.C. in 1993. She helped to establish Crow Native Days, which attracts thousands of visitors and tourists to the Crow Tribe reservation annually.

As Chairperson, Nomee shepherded the opening of the Health Service Hospital, which was built for members of the Crow Nation and members of the neighboring Northern Cheyenne. Nomee also oversaw the construction and opening of dialysis facilities, a new nursing home, and a bank.

Nomee was able to increase and attract federal and private revenue streams into the Crow Tribe's coffers. She has been largely credited with establishing financial security and stability for the Crow tribal government.

Her administration settled a long running reservation border dispute, which centered on the 107th meridian and had lasted for more than 100 years. The dispute was settled in favor of the Crow Tribe, which resulted in millions of dollars in new revenue from a trust fund from a federal coal mine, which was now located on tribal lands. Nomee also successfully fought for a water compact with the government of Montana.

However, Nomee's five terms as Chairperson were also marred by a scandal and subsequent conviction stemming from her purchase of land from the Crow Tribe in 1994. That year, Nomee acquired 80 acres of land belonging to the Crow Tribe for $8,000. The sale was approved by the Land Resources Committee, which was composed of both elected members and Nomee political appointees. It was later determined that the market value of the 80 acres was between $21,000 and $38,000, well above the $8,000 that Nomee had paid. Nomee denied any wrongdoing in the sale, but federal prosecutors, who indicted her in 1997, contended that she had used influence to coerce members of the Land Resources Committee into approving the sale, since she had appointed many of the members of the committee. She was convicted for felony theft of tribal land in September 1998.

Her sentencing was held in January 1999. Tribal officials and elders testified on her behalf at the sentencing. Nomee's contributions to the Crow Tribe were even noted by the presiding judge, U.S. District Judge for the United States District Court for the District of Montana Jack D. Shanstrom. Judge Shanstrom sentenced Nomee to six months of house arrest and ordered her to pay $21,000 in restitution. Her conviction was appealed, but upheld by a federal appeals court. However, Shanstrom allowed her to remain in office as Chairwoman and did not bar her from holding tribal office.

Nomee successfully fought off bids to remove her from office following her conviction. She was defeated for re-election to a sixth term in the May 2000 tribal election by Clifford Birdinground, who received 67% of the vote. Birdinground nullified all deals made by Nomee's administration after her 1997 indictment and fired approximately 130 Crow Tribe government employees after taking office. (Two years later, Birdinground was convicted of one count of bribery by a federal court and sentenced to a prison term of 37 months.)

Nomee largely remained largely out of the public's eye after leaving office in 2000, though she did make occasional public appearances. She died at St. Vincent's Hospital in Billings, Montana, on January 31, 2012, at the age of 73. She was buried at Lodge Grass Cemetery following a funeral at Lodge Grass Our Lady of Loretto Catholic Church.

The Crow Chairman at the time, Cedric Black Eagle, released a written statement saying, "Her 10-year tenure as madam chairman helped to bring stability in Crow tribal government and saw a decade of many achievements that still stand today to reflect the kind of leadership she brought to the Crow people."

Political offices
Preceded by Richard Real Bird	Chair of the Crow Tribe; 1990–2000	Succeeded by Clifford Birdinground
