= Chairpersons of the Crow Tribe =

Head of the executive branch of the Crow Tribe of Montana

The chairman or chairwoman of the Crow Tribe is the head of the executive branch of the Crow Tribe of Montana. Every four years, the Crow Tribal General Council (all adult-aged registered voters) elects a chairman of the executive branch.

The current chairman is Frank Whiteclay. The chairman is chief executive officer, with enumerated powers in the 2001 Crow Constitution. The constitutional changes of 2001 created a three branch government. The chairman is the head of the executive branch, which includes the offices of vice-chairman, secretary, and vice-secretary and the tribal offices and departments of the Crow Tribal Administration. Notable chairmen were Clara Nomee, Edison Real Bird, and Robert Yellowtail.

Chairmen of the Crow Tribe; the Government of the Crow Tribe; In 2001, the Crow Tribal Council by voice vote passed a measure to establish a three branch government.
The chairman of the Crow Tribe
Name	Term	Notes
Ralph Saco	1920–1921	
James Carpenter	1921–1927	
William Bends	1927–1934	
Hartford Bear Claw	1934–1938	
Charles Yarlott	1938–1941	
Henry Pretty On Top	1941–1946	
Robert "Robbie" Yellowtail	1946–1954	
William Wall	1954–1956	
Edward "Posie" Whiteman	1956–1960	
John Cummings	1960–1964	
John Wilson	1964–1966	
Edison Real Bird	1966–1972	Amended tribal constitution to allow tribal businesses (e.g. Sun Lodge Motel, Big Horn Carpet Mill, Crow Agency Teepee campground, etc.)
David Stewart	1972–1974	
Patrick Stands Over Bull	1974–1977	Removed after a successful impeachment by the Crow Tribal Council
Forrest Horn	1977–1982	
Donald Stewart	1982–1986	
Richard Real Bird	1986–1990	Defeated in election against Secretary Clara Nomee
Clara Nomee	1990–2000	Longest-serving chairman of the Crow Tribe; The first woman chairman; third woman official
Clifford Birdinground	2000–2002	Resigned from office after federal indictments
Vincent Goes Ahead	2002	Acting Chairman
Carl Venne	November 11, 2002 – February 2009	Elected to fill remaining term after Chairman Birdinground's resignation; re-elected to a 4-year term in 2008; died in office in February 2009
Cedric Black Eagle	2009 – December 3, 2012	Elected in a special election as chairman of the Executive Branch to fill the remainder of Carl Venne's 4-year term
Darrin Old Coyote	December 3, 2012 – 2016	Chairmanp
Alvin Not Afraid Jr.	2016–2020	
Frank White Clay	2020–present	
