= Lodge Grass, Montana =

Lodge Grass, Montana Eelalapiío Aashbacheeitche
- Town
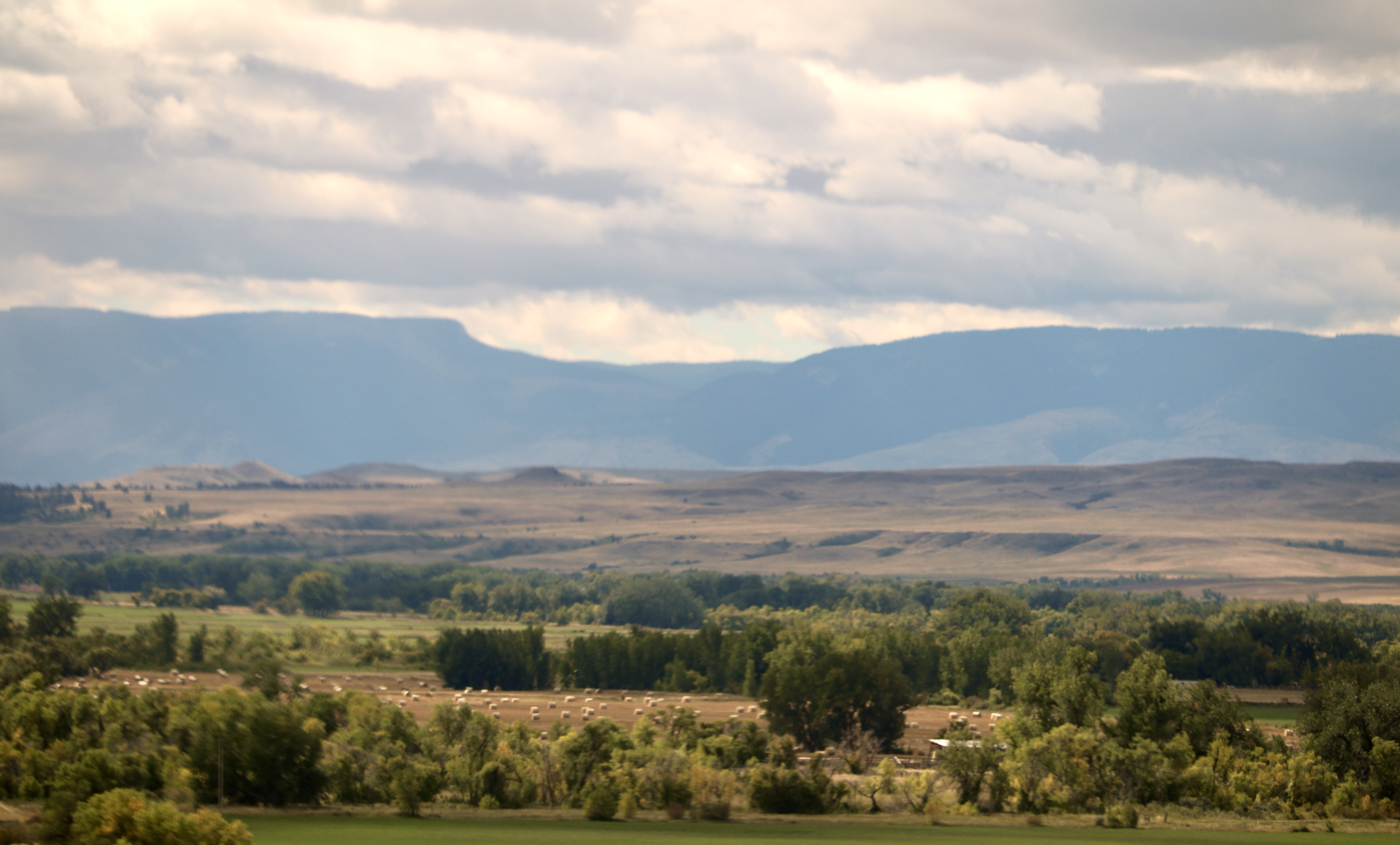
- Landforms near Lodge Grass, Montana

- Location of Lodge Grass, Montana
- Coordinates: 45°18′51″N 107°22′04″W
- Country: United States
- State: Montana
- County: Big Horn

Government
  - Mayor: Quincy Dabney

Area
  - Total: 0.26 sq mi (0.67 km^{2})
  - Land: 0.26 sq mi (0.67 km^{2})
  - Water: 0 sq mi (0.00 km^{2})
- Elevation: 3,366 ft (1,026 m)

Population (2020)
  - Total: 441
  - Density: 1,709.0/sq mi (659.83/km^{2})
- Time zone: UTC-7 (Mountain (MST))
  - Summer (DST): UTC-6 (MDT)
- ZIP code: 59050
- Area code: 406
- FIPS code: 30-44275
- GNIS feature ID: 2412909

Lodge Grass (Crow: Eelalapiío) is a town in Big Horn County, Montana, United States. The population was 441 at the 2020 census.

It is at the confluence of Lodge Grass Creek and the Little Bighorn River, on the Crow Indian Reservation.

== Source and derivation of name ==
The two words of the name of "Lodge Grass" are not usually put together, in that order, to make a commonly used name, or meaningful phrase. This is because the name "Lodge Grass" came from a mistake of interpretation of the Crow Indian name for "Greasy Grass".

Lodge Grass is named after Lodge Grass Creek, which flows through the town, but as explained in a video viewed in 2013 on YouTube by Joe Medicine Crow, Crow tribal historian, the correct Crow name for Lodge Grass Creek is Greasy Grass Creek.

Crow tradition holds that when the Crows camped on the bottoms of the Lodge Grass Creek or the Little Bighorn River in the spring and summer, when the grass in the valley would be high and when the dew was heavy the bellies and legs of the horses would become wet and glisten as if covered with grease. In another traditional version of the same derivation of the name, when the Crows camped on the creek and walked through the thick grass in the morning when it held dew, their moccasins and leggings would get wet and they would look greasy. Thus the Crows called the valley areas of the Little Bighorn River and Lodge Grass Creek "the Greasy Grass".

The Sioux also called the Little Horn River the Greasy Grass Creek.

The Crow name for "greasy" and the Crow name for "lodge" sound very much alike. The Crow word for "greasy" is Tah-shay, and the Crow word for "lodge" is Ah-shay, and the words sound so much alike that an early interpreter mistakenly interpreted the Crow name for "Greasy Grass" as "Lodge Grass".

The misinterpreted name stuck, and so the creek, and then the town became known as Lodge Grass.

== Geography ==
Interstate 90 passes near the community, with access from Exit 530. Grey Blanket Creek runs nearby.

According to the United States Census Bureau, the town has a total area of 0.24 square miles (0.62 km^{2}), all land.

A traditional camping area near the town is called Iishipia in the Crow language.

=== Climate ===
According to the Köppen Climate Classification system, Lodge Grass has a semi-arid climate, abbreviated "BSk" on climate maps.

Climate data for Lodge Grass, Montana
Month	Jan	Feb	Mar	Apr	May	Jun	Jul	Aug	Sep	Oct	Nov	Dec	Year
Mean daily maximum °C (°F)	3 (38)	7 (44)	11 (51)	16 (61)	22 (71)	27 (80)	32 (90)	32 (89)	26 (78)	18 (64)	9 (49)	4 (40)	17 (63)
Mean daily minimum °C (°F)	−8 (17)	−6 (22)	−3 (27)	2 (36)	7 (45)	11 (52)	14 (58)	14 (57)	9 (48)	4 (39)	−2 (28)	−7 (20)	3 (37)
Average precipitation mm (inches)	23 (0.9)	18 (0.7)	33 (1.3)	53 (2.1)	74 (2.9)	66 (2.6)	33 (1.3)	25 (1)	46 (1.8)	43 (1.7)	23 (0.9)	20 (0.8)	450 (17.8)
Source: Weatherbase

== Demographics ==
Historical population
Census	Pop.	Note	%±
1930	373		—
1940	839		124.9%
1950	536		−36.1%
1960	687		28.2%
1970	806		17.3%
1980	499		−38.1%
1990	517		3.6%
2000	510		−1.4%
2010	428		−16.1%
2020	441		3.0%
U.S. Decennial Census

=== 2010 census ===
As of the census of 2010, there were 428 people, 114 households, and 95 families residing in the town. The population density was 1,783.3 inhabitants per square mile (688.5/km^{2}). There were 133 housing units at an average density of 554.2 per square mile (214.0/km^{2}). The racial makeup of the town was 9.6% White, 86.7% Native American, 0.2% Asian, 0.2% from other races, and 3.3% from two or more races. Hispanic or Latino of any race were 1.4% of the population.

There were 114 households, of which 59.6% had children under the age of 18 living with them, 43.9% were married couples living together, 26.3% had a female householder with no husband present, 13.2% had a male householder with no wife present, and 16.7% were non-families. 16.7% of all households were made up of individuals, and 7.1% had someone living alone who was 65 years of age or older. The average household size was 3.75 and the average family size was 4.05.

The median age in the town was 24.7 years. 39.7% of residents were under the age of 18; 10.7% were between the ages of 18 and 24; 20% were from 25 to 44; 20.7% were from 45 to 64; and 8.6% were 65 years of age or older. The gender makeup of the town was 47.2% male and 52.8% female.

=== 2000 census ===
As of the census of 2000, there were 510 people, 147 households, and 115 families residing in the town. The population density was 2,141.7 inhabitants per square mile (826.9/km^{2}). There were 164 housing units at an average density of 688.7 per square mile (265.9/km^{2}). The racial makeup of the town was 11.57% White, 86.67% Native American, 0.59% from other races, and 1.18% from two or more races. Hispanic or Latino of any race were 1.57% of the population.

There were 147 households, out of which 57.1% had children under the age of 18 living with them, 47.6% were married couples living together, 27.2% had a female householder with no husband present, and 21.1% were non-families. 18.4% of all households were made up of individuals, and 6.1% had someone living alone who was 65 years of age or older. The average household size was 3.47 and the average family size was 3.90.

In the town, the population was spread out, with 42.4% under the age of 18, 9.6% from 18 to 24, 29.0% from 25 to 44, 13.5% from 45 to 64, and 5.5% who were 65 years of age or older. The median age was 23 years. For every 100 females there were 92.5 males. For every 100 females age 18 and over, there were 77.1 males.

The median income for a household in the town was $22,120, and the median income for a family was $22,222. Males had a median income of $20,833 versus $20,375 for females. The per capita income for the town was $8,130. About 37.1% of families and 40.3% of the population were below the poverty line, including 47.4% of those under age 18 and 31.4% of those age 65 or over.

== Government ==
The mayor of Lodge Grass is Quincey Dabney. He was a write-in candidate in 2017. At the time there was no mayor for the town. He ran unopposed in 2022 and 2025.

== Education ==
The Lodge Grass city limits and surrounding is located within School District 2 & 27, or Lodge Grass Schools. The public school system has been in existence since 1908. The mascot for Lodge Grass Schools are the Indians and Lady Indians. The Lodge Grass High School boys' basketball program is noted for having won five Class B state championships from 1980 to 1990, under Coach Gordon Real Bird.

== Notable people ==
- Hairy Moccasin (1854 — 1922), a scout for the Seventh Cavalry
- Tuff Harris (b. 1983), National Football League, 2007–2011 and in 2011, Canadian Football League
- Jake Jabs (b. 1930), founder and CEO of American Furniture Warehouse
- Joe Medicine Crow (1913 – 2016), author and historian of the Crow Tribe
- Clara Nomee (1938 – 2012), former five-term chairwoman of the Crow Tribe (1990–2000)
- Kevin Red Star (b. 1943), Native American artist
- Pauline Small (1924 – 2005), first woman to be elected to any office of the Crow Tribe
- White Man Runs Him (c. 1858 – 1929), scout and source for the history of the Battle of the Little Bighorn.
- Thomas Yellowtail (1903 - 1993), medicine man and chief of the Crow Tribe; born in Lodge Grass
