= Little Big Horn College =

Tribal college in Crow Agency, Montana, U.S.

- Type: Public tribal land-grant community college
- Established: 1980
- Parent institution: Crow Tribe
- Academic affiliations: American Indian Higher Education Consortium; American Association of Community Colleges; Space-grant
- President: Neva Tall Bear
- Location: Crow Agency, Montana, U.S. 45°36′12″N 107°27′22″W
- Campus: Rural
- Colours: Gold, blue, and white
- Nickname: Rams
- Website: www.lbhc.edu

Little Big Horn College is a public tribal land-grant community college in Crow Agency, Montana. It has an open admissions policy and welcomes enrollment from any adult with a high school diploma or GED. The student body is composed of Crow Tribe members (95 percent), members of other Native American tribes from around the Intermountain West (3 percent), and non-Native American residents of the Big Horn County, Montana area (2 percent).

== History ==
Little Big Horn College was chartered in 1980 by the Crow Tribe of Indians as a public two-year community college. Dr. Janine Pease advocated the college's founding and was the college's first president. The name Little Big Horn comes from the smaller of the two rivers on the reservation, both receiving the distinction by the Big Horn Mountains, where the rivers originate. In 1994, the college was designated a land-grant college alongside 31 other tribal colleges.

== Academics ==
LBHC offers six associate of arts and three associate of science degree programs, with one more associate of science degree program in a pilot stage. The courses of study are directed to the economic and job opportunities in the Crow Indian Reservation area, focusing on education, business, Crow studies, agriculture, office/technical work, and infrastructure. The school also offers seven one-year certificate programs.

== Campus ==
The LBHC facility consists of 35,000 square feet (3,300 m^{2}) of educational space. The LBHC campus is situated on two acres of wooded river valley.

The campus has committed itself to sustainable energy with a goal of carbon neutrality (net-zero emissions). In 2016, the campus installed a 45-kilowatt photovoltaic system on the Health and Wellness Center to capture solar energy, partially funded via grants from the Office of Indian Energy Policy and Programs through the United States Department of Energy.

In 2021, the college received a US$100,000 grant from the Institute of Museum and Library Services to build a new cultural center and museum, and the planning committee input from the tribe to fill the "need for exhibits within the reservation constructed and interpreted by Indigenous people", citing a recent Crow exhibit at the Field Museum of Natural History in Chicago, Illinois, as an example of a museum ensuring active representation. As part of the planning committee, Crow Studies adjunct instructor and former state representative Sharon Stewart-Peregoy gave statements to local news for more use of the Crow language in the museum, in alignment with community requests.

== Student life and activities ==
The college offers men and women's basketball leagues that compete in region nine of the National Junior College Athletic Association. At the campus's Health and Wellness Center, students can lift weights and take classes in yoga, aerobics, and nutrition education.

== Governance ==
The college is directed by the board of trustees elected by districts within the reservation.

== Partnerships ==
The college is member of the American Indian Higher Education Consortium, which is a community of tribally and federally chartered institutions working to strengthen tribal nations and make a lasting difference in the lives of American Indians and Alaska Natives. ANC was created in response to the higher education needs of American Indians. ANC generally serves geographically isolated populations that have no other means accessing education beyond the high school level.

The college has a partnership with Yellowstone Christian College.

== See also ==
- Crow Tribe
