= Crow Agency, Montana =

Census designated place in Montana, United States

Crow Agency, Montana Baaxawuaashé
- CDP
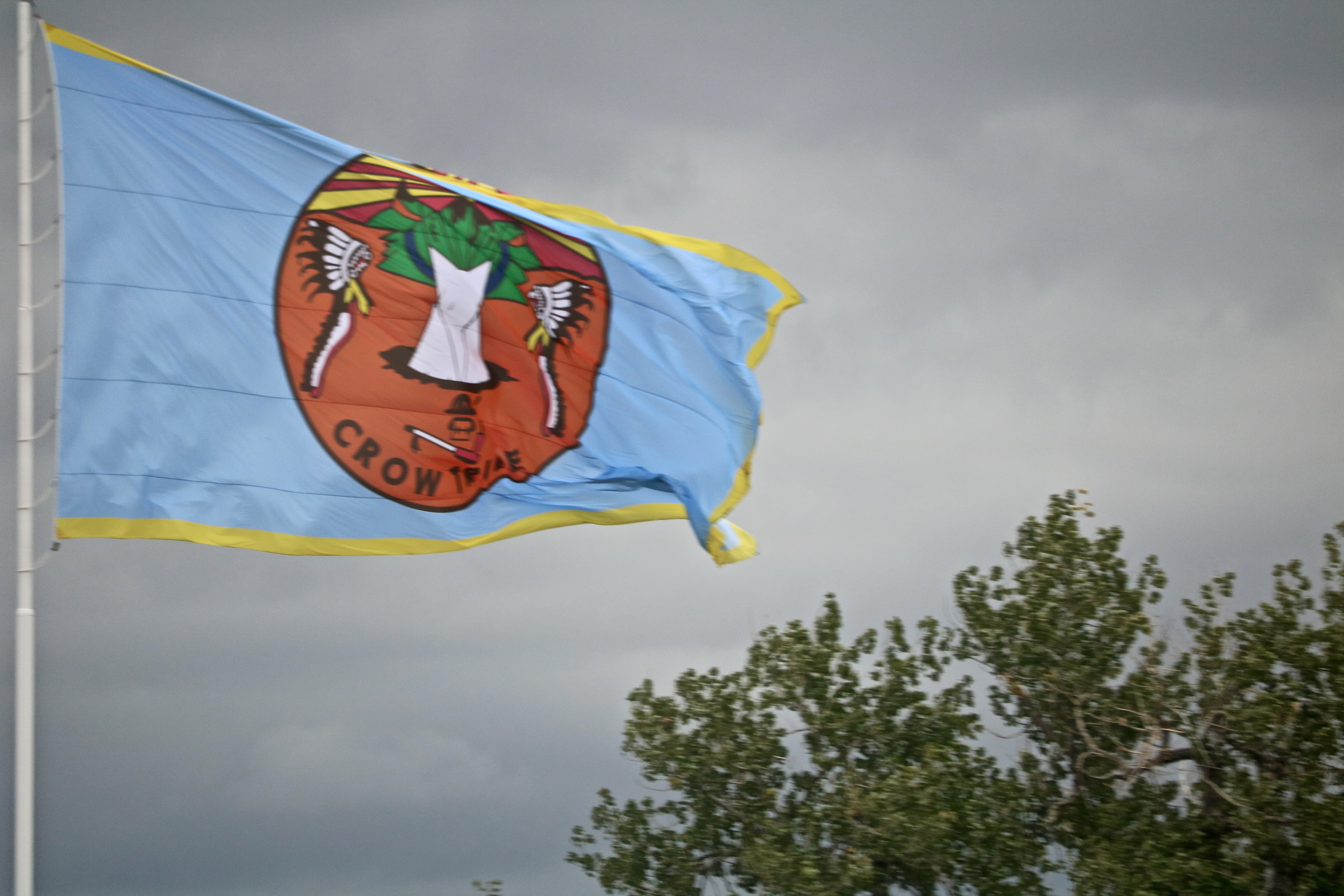
- Crow Tribe flag at Crow Agency

- Location of Crow Agency, Montana
- Coordinates: 45°37′05″N 107°27′38″W
- Country: United States
- State: Montana
- County: Big Horn

Area
  - Total: 7.34 sq mi (19.01 km^{2})
  - Land: 7.34 sq mi (19.01 km^{2})
  - Water: 0 sq mi (0.00 km^{2})
- Elevation: 3,035 ft (925 m)

Population (2020)
  - Total: 1,657
  - Density: 225.7/sq mi (87.16/km^{2})
- Time zone: UTC-7 (Mountain (MST))
  - Summer (DST): UTC-6 (MDT)
- ZIP code: 59022
- Area code: 406
- FIPS code: 30-18250
- GNIS feature ID: 2407687

Crow Agency (Crow: Baaxawuaashé) is a census-designated place (CDP) in Big Horn County, Montana, United States and is near the actual location for the Little Bighorn National Monument and re-enactment produced by the Real Bird family known as Battle of the Little Bighorn Reenactment. As of the 2020 census, Crow Agency had a population of 1,657. It is the governmental headquarters of the Crow Nation Native Americans. It is also the location of the "agency offices" where the federal Superintendent of the Crow Indian Reservation and his staff (part of the Bureau of Indian Affairs, United States Department of the Interior) interacts with the Crow Tribe, pursuant to federal treaties and statutes.

The ending scenes in the film Little Big Man (1970) were filmed in Crow Agency.

== Geography ==
Interstate 90 passes through the community, with access from Exit 509. U.S. Route 212 also passes through the town. Custer Creek runs alongside town.

According to the United States Census Bureau, the CDP has a total area of 7.3 square miles (19 km^{2}), all land.

== History of the three locations of the "Crow Agency" ==
The term "Crow Agency" has been historically used since 1868 for the headquarters where the United States directed the federal interaction with the Crow tribe on its reservation. The Crow Tribe's reservations, and the tribe's relations to the United States were defined by treaties between the Crow Tribe and the United States, and by United States statutes.

=== A Reservation Without An Agency (1851-1868) ===
The Treaty of Fort Laramie of 1851 created extensive reservation lands for the Indian tribes in Montana, Wyoming and the Dakotas at a time when the non-Indian presence in this area was limited to roving traders. A large reservation for the Crow Tribe was set out that was centered on the Big Horn Mountains and extended eastward into the Powder River basin to the banks of the Powder River. However, this treaty did not indicate agency sites for any of the tribes, including the Crows. At the time of the treaty, 1851 the Crow tribe consisted of nomadic bands whose culture was based on hunting the migratory buffalo herds, including those herds in the Powder River Country. Hunting in the Powder River area on the east side of the Big Horn Mountains brought the Crow in increasing conflict with more powerful bands of Sioux who were migrating westward. In 1863 gold was discovered in commercial quantities in the mountains of the western Montana Territory. Travelers to the gold fields left the Oregon Trail and traveled through the Powder River country, going up the east side of the Big Horns to the Yellowstone valley, and then westward. This route became known as the Bozeman Trail, and three forts were built to protect travelers. The Sioux conducted an all out war against the forts and the travelers on the Bozeman Trail called "Red Cloud's War", which finally forced the United States to agree to abandon the forts, and close the trail, and to remake the boundaries of the reservations for the Crow and Sioux in the Fort Laramie Treaty of 1868.

=== The First Crow Agency (1868-1874) ===
The Fort Laramie "Treaty with the Crows, 1868", was one of a series of treaties that recognized the encroaching presence of the Sioux tribes into the Powder River Basin, and gave them that entire area as a hunting preserve. The separate 1868 treaty with the Crow moved the center of the Crow lands to the west of the Powder River Basin, into the western portions of the Yellowstone Valley. The 1868 Treaty provided for annuities and other federal support, and stipulated that the Crow would have an agency "on the south side of the Yellowstone, near Otter Creek", close to present day Big Timber, Montana. The first Crow Agency (1869-1874) was eventually constructed about eight miles east of present-day Livingston, Montana on Mission Creek, and became known as Fort Parker. This first Crow Agency was located in the western reaches of the Yellowstone River Valley, north of the Absaroka Range of Mountains. The Crows continued a largely nomadic life style hunting on the buffalo ranges to the east, though this brought them in constant but sporadic conflict with the Sioux who dominated the Powder River area.

=== The Second Crow Agency (1875-1884) ===
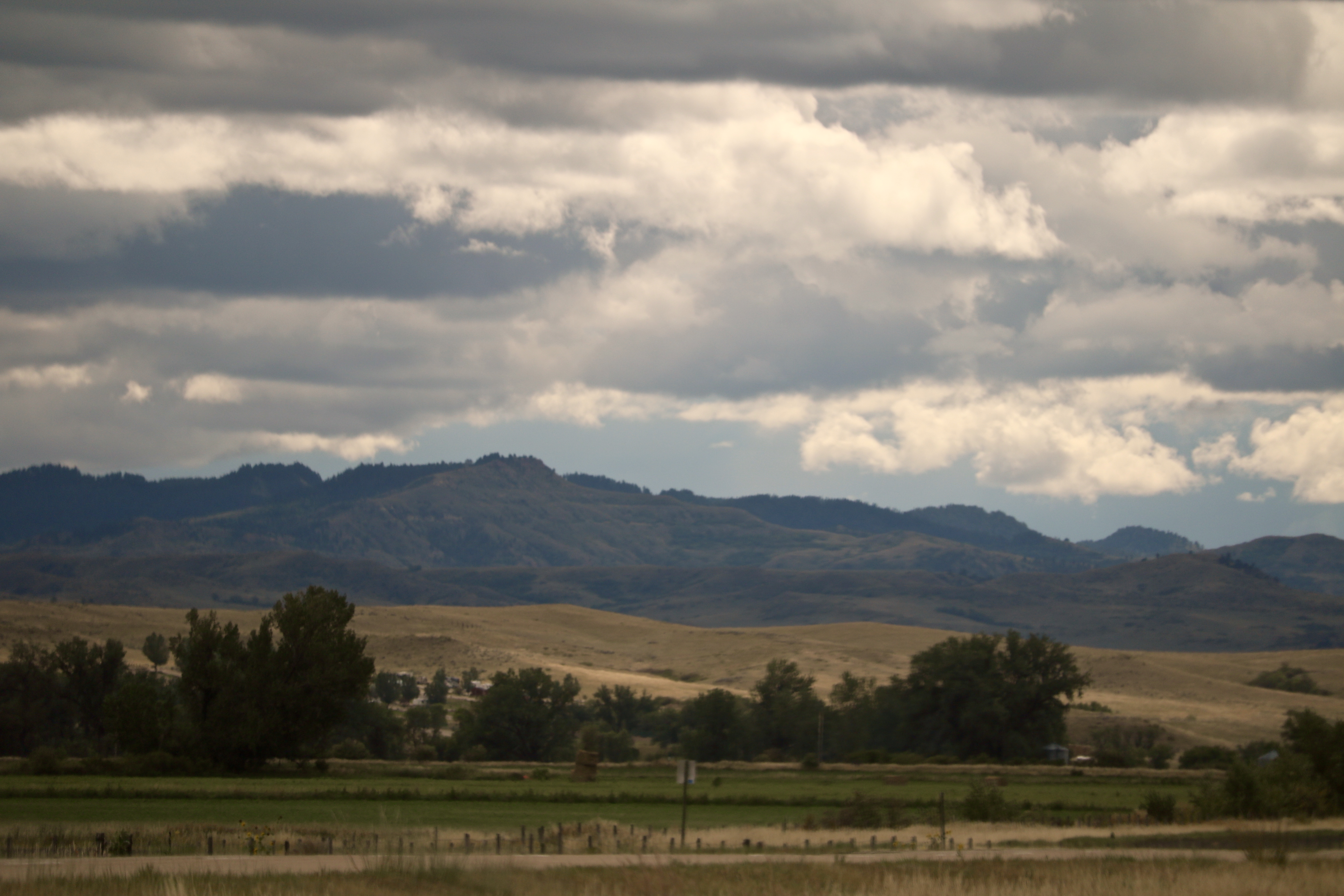
Landforms near Crow Agency, Montana

In 1874 miners encroached on the western margins of Crow lands in the Absaroka Range, and the reservation was reduced in 1875. The first Crow Agency was within these ceded lands and so the Agency was relocated eastward to a new site just south of modern-day Absarokee, Montana. The second Crow Agency (1875-1884) was still located north of the Absaroka Range of Mountains but about 66 miles further east of Fort Parker in the Yellowstone Valley, on the Stillwater River which was a tributary of the Yellowstone River.

The nine year period from 1875 to 1884 was a time of rapid transition on the plains of eastern Montana and Wyoming. In 1876 the Crows provided scouts for the United States military forces in the Great Sioux War of 1876. The defeat by the Sioux of George Armstrong Custer at the Battle of the Little Big Horn in 1876 resulted in a concerted military backlash against the Sioux, and by 1877 and 1878 the hostile bands of Sioux had either fled to Canada, or they had surrendered and were confined to reservations along the Missouri River in the Dakotas. This initially left the Crows more secure in their use of the buffalo ranges on the eastern Montana and Wyoming plains, but in 1876 and 1877 federal forts were built across this area. With hostile Indian presence essentially neutralized, hide hunters came to harvest the northern buffalo herds. By 1882 the buffalo were gone from this area. Also, in 1880 the Northern Pacific Railroad began building eastward from Bismarck, ND, and in 1882 they completed their northern transcontinental line, which passed up the Yellowstone River valley just as the last of the buffalo disappeared. Almost at once large Texas trail herds arrived in the Montana Territory to exploit the now empty open range on the vast plains of central and eastern Montana. These successive rapid changes in this 9-year period eliminated the herds of bison and reduced other wild game on which the Crow culture relied, and ended forever the Crow's nomadic way of life.

=== The Third Crow Agency (1884 to Present) ===
In 1884 these events led to the last movement of the Crow Agency to the site of its third and final location at present day Crow Agency, Montana, 60 miles SE of Billings on the Little Bighorn River. This move of over a hundred miles eastward removed the Crow people from the vicinity of the Absaroka Range of Mountains, and from the Yellowstone River valley, and placed their reservation center on the east side of the Big Horn Mountains, on the western edge of the Powder River Basin of the northern great plains.

== Demographics ==
Historical population
Census	Pop.	Note	%±
2020	1,657		—
U.S. Decennial Census

=== 2020 census ===
As of the 2020 census, Crow Agency had a population of 1,657. The median age was 26.6 years. 38.9% of residents were under the age of 18 and 9.3% of residents were 65 years of age or older. For every 100 females there were 94.0 males, and for every 100 females age 18 and over there were 86.9 males age 18 and over.

0.0% of residents lived in urban areas, while 100.0% lived in rural areas.

There were 371 households in Crow Agency, of which 57.1% had children under the age of 18 living in them. Of all households, 32.3% were married-couple households, 25.1% were households with a male householder and no spouse or partner present, and 36.1% were households with a female householder and no spouse or partner present. About 20.7% of all households were made up of individuals and 8.1% had someone living alone who was 65 years of age or older.

There were 410 housing units, of which 9.5% were vacant. The homeowner vacancy rate was 0.0% and the rental vacancy rate was 2.9%.

Racial composition as of the 2020 census
Race	Number	Percent
White	28	1.7%
Black or African American	1	0.1%
American Indian and Alaska Native	1,590	96.0%
Asian	2	0.1%
Native Hawaiian and Other Pacific Islander	1	0.1%
Some other race	3	0.2%
Two or more races	32	1.9%
Hispanic or Latino (of any race)	24	1.4%

=== 2000 census ===
Languages (2000)	Percent
Spoke Crow at home	55.13%
Spoke English at home	44.87%

As of the census of 2000, there were 1,552 people, 336 households, and 303 families residing in the CDP. The population density was 213.3 inhabitants per square mile (82.4/km^{2}). There were 361 housing units at an average density of 49.6 per square mile (19.2/km^{2}). The racial makeup of the CDP was 3.74% White, 95.68% Native American, 0.06% Asian, and 0.52% from two or more races. Hispanic or Latino of any race were 1.16% of the population.

There were 336 households, out of which 52.4% had children under the age of 18 living with them, 55.4% were married couples living together, 26.5% had a female householder with no husband present, and 9.8% were non-families. 7.4% of all households were made up of individuals, and 0.6% had someone living alone who was 65 years of age or older. The average household size was 4.40 and the average family size was 4.66.

In the CDP, the population was spread out, with 41.5% under the age of 18, 10.6% from 18 to 24, 25.5% from 25 to 44, 17.8% from 45 to 64, and 4.6% who were 65 years of age or older. The median age was 23 years. For every 100 females, there were 96.5 males. For every 100 females age 18 and over, there were 89.2 males.

The median income for a household in the CDP was $22,438, and the median income for a family was $27,768. Males had a median income of $17,300 versus $15,804 for females. The per capita income for the CDP was $7,354. About 39.6% of families and 40.9% of the population were below the poverty line, including 42.6% of those under age 18 and none of those age 65 or over.

The Annual Crow Fair, which is held every third weekend in August, is held on this reservation. The Crow Fair is known as "The Teepee Capital of the World," by the fact that during celebration as many as 1,500 teepees are seen across the river valley of the Little Big Horn River. The PBS series Reading Rainbow filmed its tenth episode "The Gift of the Sacred Dog" here on June 17, 1983. The title was based on a book by Paul Goble and was narrated by actor Michael Ansara.

== Notable people ==
- Tuff Harris, NFL safety, was born in Crow Agency
- Clara Nomee, former Chairwoman of the Crow Tribe, was born here.
- Christian Parrish Takes the Gun, AKA Supaman, grew up here.

== Education ==
Crow Agency has an elementary school. Hardin High School serves 9th through 12th grade.

Crow Agency is home to Little Big Horn College.

== Climate ==
According to the Köppen Climate Classification system, Crow Agency has a semi-arid climate, abbreviated "BSk" on climate maps. The town averages 41" of snowfall annually.

Climate data for Crow Agency, Montana
Month	Jan	Feb	Mar	Apr	May	Jun	Jul	Aug	Sep	Oct	Nov	Dec	Year
Mean daily maximum °F (°C)	33 (1)	38 (3)	48 (9)	61 (16)	71 (22)	81 (27)	90 (32)	88 (31)	77 (25)	65 (18)	48 (9)	38 (3)	62 (17)
Mean daily minimum °F (°C)	6 (−14)	10 (−12)	20 (−7)	31 (−1)	40 (4)	48 (9)	53 (12)	50 (10)	41 (5)	31 (−1)	20 (−7)	11 (−12)	30 (−1)
Average precipitation inches (mm)	0.8 (20)	0.7 (18)	1.1 (28)	1.7 (43)	2.4 (61)	2.4 (61)	1.1 (28)	1 (25)	1.5 (38)	1.3 (33)	0.9 (23)	0.8 (20)	15.4 (390)
Source: Weatherbase

== See also ==
- Crow War
