= The Other Magpie =

The Other Magpie was a Crow woman best known for fighting in the Battle of the Rosebud on the side of General George Crook against the Sioux and Cheyenne, alongside Osh-Tisch.

Pretty Shield, a Crow author and medicine woman, described her as being wild and attractive, but not having a man. She fought for revenge against the Sioux who had killed her brother. Most of the Crow carried rifles, but The Other Magpie carried only her belt knife and her coup stick. She counted coup on a Sioux warrior and eventually killed and scalped him. The scalp that she took was one of only eleven taken in the battle. Shield described her as having tied a feather on the end of her coup stick to symbolize her achievement. Later, she cut the scalp into pieces and gave them to the male warriors so they would have more scalps for the dance after the battle. An alternative report has The Other Magpie take part in the dance herself.

== See also ==
- Buffalo Calf Road Woman

== Sources ==
- Ewers, John C. (June 1965). "DEADLIER than the MALE". American Heritage. 16 (4).

Specific
