= Osh-Tisch =

Crow badé warrior

Osh-Tisch (Crow: "Finds Them and Kills Them") was a Crow badé. A badé (also spelled baté and boté) is a person thought to be male at birth in a Crow community who takes part in some of the social and ceremonial roles usually filled by women in that culture.

Osh-Tisch fought in the 1876 Battle of the Rosebud, as recounted by Pretty Shield. During the battle, Osh-Tisch and a woman named The Other Magpie saved Bull Snake, and Osh-Tisch later shot a Lakota warrior, for which Osh-Tisch received her name.

In the late 1890s, an American agent named Briskow, tasked with forcing the Plains Indians to assimilate into the dominant culture, jailed Osh-Tisch and the other badés, and forced them to get masculine haircuts, wear masculine clothing, and perform manual labor such as planting trees. The Crow, who considered their badés valuable members of their community, particularly known for their needlework and cooking, were outraged, saying this abuse went against their nature. Chief Pretty Eagle used what power he had to compel the agent to resign and leave tribal lands. Crow historian Joe Medicine Crow, delivering this oral history in 1982 said, "It was a tragedy, trying to change them."

Osh-Tisch was one of the last known badés of the Crow Nation, and the institution of the badé is said to have gone into decline during Osh-Tisch's life. With modern LGBT communities providing more options in current society, some contemporary badé people may participate in a revival of these traditions, or in the modern, pan-Indian two-spirit or LGBT communities.
