= Max Big Man =

Crow educator, historian and artist

- Born: Crow Agency, Montana
- Citizenship: Crow Nation
- Occupations: educator, painter

Max Big Man was a Crow educator, historian, and artist born in Crow Agency, Montana. He represented the Crow in Washington, D.C., promoted the Custer Battlefield Association, and was made an honorary chief by Plenty Coups. Big Man worked with CBS Radio to conduct educational programming about Native Americans, sharing information and playing his flute.

== Career ==
The Crow reservation where Big Man lived had a railroad stop, where trains would stop briefly before heading towards more populated places like Billings, Montana. Some time in the 1920s, Big Man began delivering historical lectures on Native life and the Little Bighorn Battlefield for tourists at the train stop. The Chicago, Burlington and Quincy Railroad soon saw an opportunity to capitalize on these lectures. Railroad staff encouraged Crow Agency superintendent Charles Asbury to provide "atmosphere" and entertainment at the stop with stereotypical "Indian lore" such as "beads and buckskin, eagle feathers, war bonnets, tomahawks ... and typical Indian tepees." In the summer 1929, the Railroad paid Big Man fifty dollars per month to entertain tourists at the stop.

Big Man's reputation grew. In 1930, the Custer Battlefield Hiway Association hired Big Man to tour the Midwestern United States promoting the highway. He also visited New York City and Chicago. In 1930, the Chicago Daily News quoted him as telling New York mayor Jimmy Walker, "You have some fine high tepees here in New York city, but I like our tepees better in Montana."

In subsequent years, Big Man travelled occasionally for his work with Columbia Broadcasting System and New York schools. On one such trip he met actress Te Ata, and the two became friends. During another trip to Washington, D.C., Big Man visited President Herbert Hoover to pay respects.

== Personal life ==
Big Man was described as "a towering Indian." He painted as a hobby, often depicting scenes from tribal life and his own activities.
