= Two Leggings =

Warrior of the Crow Nation

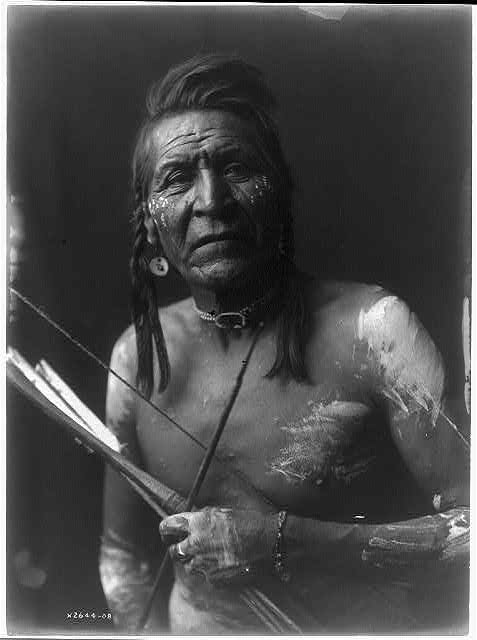
Two Leggings captured by photographer Edward S. Curtis in 1906

Two Leggings (Crow: Issaatxalúash) or Apitisée ("Big (Whooping) Crane") was a Crow Akdúxxiilee (warrior), Íipche Akeé (war leader or pipe carrier) and Bacheeítche (local group leader) of the Binnéessiippeele (River Crow Band). Two Legging's exact birth date is unknown. It is assumed he was born between the years of 1846 and 1851. His death is recorded as April 23, 1923.

The events of Two Legging's life were documented by William Wildschut, the author of Two Leggings: The Making of a Crow Warrior. This biography has served as an important source of information about Plains Indian life, as it was, prior to the reservation era.

== Warrior legacy ==
Two Leggings resided in the Crow Nation with the rank of Pipe Holder, equal to platoon lieutenant. Once the extermination of the American bison began, the competition among the Plains Indians was at its fiercest. War became a struggle of life and death in the many plains societies. War was no trivial matter, in the societies it was a very spiritual matter. War required the proper ceremonies and occult assistance. Triumph in war was contingent on divine arrangements, war medicine, the bravery of the warrior, and the expertise they possessed. Owing to the constant state of war found in the Great Plains, death in conflict was a special honor, people who died young were thought to have had a weak sacred helper or that they did not abide by their sacred father. Warriors who lived into old age were believed to have very formidable spiritual helpers. Two Leggings lived to be quite old, though it was deemed that he did not have a very strong spiritual helper due to the inadequacy of his spiritual manifestations. He eventually went onto buy War Medicine from Sees the Living Bull, but ultimately it did little to help him.

== Spirituality ==
Two Leggings conducted many raids before the Crow Nation was confined to a reservation. Two Leggings was described as a very modest individual, documented by William Wildschut, in his field manual about Two Leggings. Two Leggings talked about both his triumphs and defeats during his raids against his band's enemies. One of Two Leggings' first raids he tried his luck because he went to battle without War Medicine. This raid almost cost him his life, he lost his horse and blanket, his Moccasins and clothing were tattered, though he still held onto his gun and bow. Though his spiritual helper may have been considered overall not strong, he still had visions, that were deemed strong by his peers.

== Sun Dance experience ==
The Sun Dance is a highly sacred event that occurred within the Plains Indian culture, as well as other indigenous groups in North America. As interaction with whites grew in the 19th century, in order to "civilize" the native peoples, certain practices like the Sun Dance were suppressed because it was determined to be too gruesome. Due to this suppression not everything is known about the Sun Dance. Two Leggings performed his first Sun Dance after his two cousins were killed in a raid against the Cheyenne. His uncle Shows His Face was deranged with heartache over the loss of his two sons. Shows His Face asked a friend Puts Earth On Top Of His Head, to use his Sun Dance Medicine Bundle, which was particularly powerful. Two Leggings did not take part in the preparations of the ritual, while still mourning the loss of his two cousins. Once everything was prepared Two Leggings decided that he would be one of the dancers in the ceremony. He participated in the brutal ritual, and while dancing a skewer came loose and he began to bleed profusely. He tried to dance again but the sheer exhaustion kept him from continuing, only watching from the side while praying for his own vision. The next morning he was awoken and informed of Shows His Face's powerful vision, when asked if he had received a vision Two Leggings admitted that he did not. An elder spoke in a tender tone, explaining that after going through a Sun Dance everyone would acknowledge him as a Man.

== Personal life ==
Two Leggings married his wife Ties Up Her Bundle around 1880 according to testimony given by Ties Up Her Bundle in 1924 at a hearing dictating who gained control of Two Leggings' capital. They never had their own children but they adopted Red Clay Woman, the daughter of his wife's sister. They later went on to adopt the son of Red Clay Woman, Amos Two Leggings also known as Sings to the Sweat Lodge.

== See also ==
- Crow Nation
- Plains Indians
- American Indian Wars
- Sun Dance
