= Elias Not Afraid =

Crow (Apsaalooke) artist, born 1990

- Born: 1990 (age 35–36); Montana, U.S.
- Known for: Beadwork

Elias Jade Not Afraid (born 1990) is an Apsáalooke (Crow/Absaroke) artist known for his traditional and non-traditional beadwork.

He is a member of the Crow Tribe of Montana, who grew up on the Crow Reservation between Lodge Grass and Wyola, Montana.

== Career ==
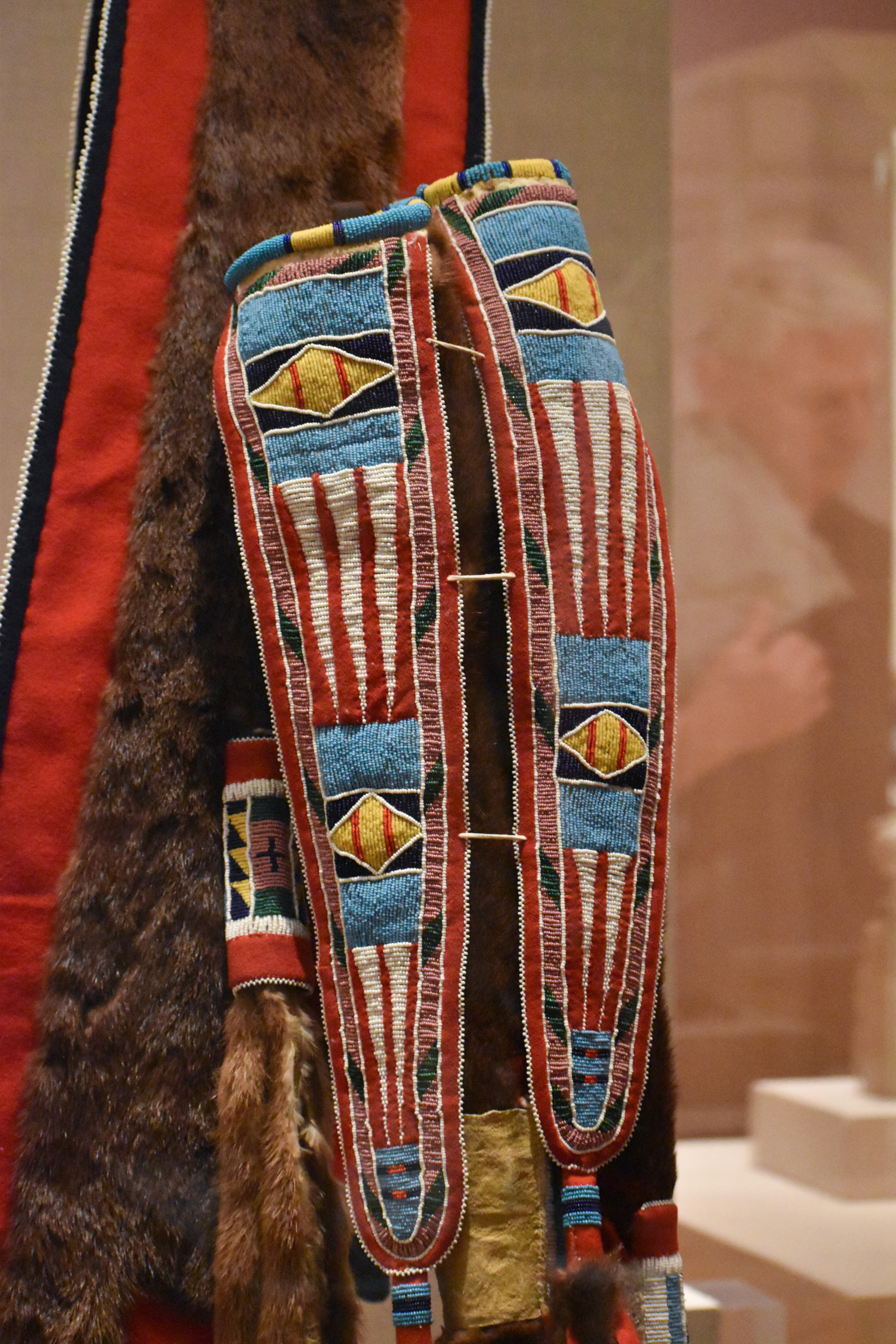
An example of a historical beaded Absáalooke (Crow) quiver, c.1800

Not Afraid is self-taught. He began making beaded jewelry when he was twelve years old and living in Lodge Grass. He taught himself how to bead using two needles by reverse engineering the beadwork on a pair of leggings his great-grandmother, Joy Yellowtail, had made. Not Afraid described the experience: "It was during the winter. It was a really bad winter. We couldn’t do anything outside. We were living in my great-grandmother's house and she had a lot of her old stuff there, a lot of it was beading stuff. I found a pair of her leggings and I always wondered how she did it, so I just kind of took it apart. I would take one row of beads out and kind of reverse engineer it and see how she did it."

He also learned beading techniques from examining the historical beadwork in the Field Museum of Natural History. There he noticed three varieties of beadwork that were no longer being produced. Because of his concern that these techniques were dying out, he figured out the process and shared it with others. Not Afraid also taught himself how to sew ermine fur into pouches. He is interested in passing along these techniques to younger generations, stating that: "Beadwork is vital for our tribe's survival in the modern times to keep our traditions alive."

He has exhibited his work in several venues, having first exhibited it in 2016 at the Heard Museum's Indian Art Market in Phoenix, Arizona and at the annual Santa Fe Indian Market where he won several awards. His work was featured in the Apsaalooké: Women and Warriors exhibition at the Field Museum in Chicago, Illinois.

Not Afraid's work became widely known when it was featured in the film, Killers of the Flower Moon. The necklace worn by Lily Gladstone was a modernized version of a traditional Crow-style dentalium breastplate. His work has been written about in Vogue, Shoutout Arizona, Western Art and Architecture Magazine, and Native Art Magazine where it was featured on the cover.

== Collections ==
Not Afraid's work is in the permanent collections of the Metropolitan Museum of Art, the Henry Ford Museum, the Museum of the Chicago Art Institute, the Smithsonian Institution's National Museum of the American Indian, and the Minneapolis Institute of Art.
