= Bull Chief =

Crow tribe leader

Bull Chief of the Absaroke tribe

Bull Chief (c. 1825 - February 4, 1914) was an Apsaroke (Crow) chief.

== Early years ==
Bull Chief, born in about 1825, died February 4, 1914, was part of the Crow, or Apsaroke tribe. He was interviewed by a man named Edward S. Curtis, who visited many tribes during the 20th century for interviews and to take portraits of the Natives. As a young man Bull Chief was never very successful when he was part of war-parties and always returned home without honor. He believed it was unnecessary for one to fast in order to be successful in a battle, and therefore opted not to fast. Being so unsuccessful after returning from battle after battle, Bull Chief decided to climb Cloud Peak, which is the highest peak of the Bullhorn Mountains in Wyoming. Bull Chief stayed up on Cloud Peak for one day and one night hoping to have a vision, but having no luck he had to leave because mountain-rats were biting through his clothes and a fierce blizzard was causing hazardous conditions. When Bull Chief returned home, his village was getting ready to be moved to a new location. Based on landmarks mentioned in the new location, it appears the tribe was moved near Red Lodge Creek, MT. During this transition time, Bull Chief decided to continue trying to fast in order to have a vision. He fasted for four days and four nights, but still had no vision. After which, he tried two more times unsuccessfully. Seeing that his current attempts were failing, and all of the other men in his tribe counting coup he again decided to try something new. For this attempt, he went up to the head of Red Lodge Creek to fast for four days and for four nights in blinding snow. This time his experience turned out much different from all of his previous attempts. He had a vision in which he, "Saw his own lodge and a splendid bay horse standing in front of it." It was not explained as to what this vision meant, but thereafter Bull Chief began to do remarkably well in battles. Shortly after the vision, Bull Chief was able to get his first honor and started counting coupe frequently. Counting coup is the highest honor for winning intertribal wars between Plains Indians. Bull Chief's determination and personal strength helped him to his successes as a hunter, in combat, and in spiritual pursuits.

== Life ==
Bull Chief was a fierce warrior who led his warriors into battle with the United States Army in the Great Plains, raiding white settlements during the course of the 1870s, operating in Apsaroke territory to help his people survive against the westward expansion. But after the wars were over, he moved to the Crow Reservation. In 1908, he met photographer Edward S. Curtis and had his picture taken, an elderly veteran whose war years were long past.

=== Marriages and Mourning ===
Bull Chief took 15 wives in total and gave up 13 of them. One of Bull Chief's wives, most likely his first because she is referred to as his young wife, was killed by a bank of earth falling on her. In order to mourn for his young wife, Bull Chief decided he wanted to go through some form of torture to honor her death. Shortly after he made his decision to endure torture for his wife, two local tribesmen went out and killed a buffalo bull and brought back the head attached to a long strip of skin and including the tail at the end, to the edge of the village. When Bull Chief heard of this, the next morning he went out and bathed; afterward, he went to Big Shadow, a clansman, to ask him to pierce him. Big Shadow accepted and instructed Bull Chief to go bathe again, remove every ornament from his body, rub himself with sage, and he would come and meet him.

After Bull Chief had concluded his tasks, Big Shadow came and found him, bringing with him three other men. Big Shadow started off the process then by painted Bull Chief from head to toe with white clay. Once Bull Chief was painted, Big Shadow then pierced Bull Chief's back muscle in two separate places and thrust skewers through the slits in his muscle to attach the thongs fastened to the nostrils of the buffalo head. Next Big Shadow pierced Bull Chief's shoulders and from those slits, hung the shield and tomahawks. Bull Chief was then given a staff and instructed to get up off the ground. After getting up Big Shadow told Bull Chief he needed to walk around the village four times while the three men with them would smoke. This was a difficult task for Bull Chief to accomplish, because the dogs in the community would jump on the skin and when dogs were not jumping on it, it was getting caught in the sage brush under it.

At sunset Bull Chief went up on a hilltop and laid down with his head between the horns of the buffalo and his feet at the tail, pointing east. He stayed up on the hilltop all night to rest from the day's activities. During his sleep, Bull Chief had another vision, this time of a man standing at his feet, then turning and departing. Big Shadow came up on the hilltop around sunrise and informed Bull Chief that he knew someone had some and visited him the night before. At first Bull Chief did not tell Big Shadow what the man looked like who had visited him, but after Bull Chief bathed and cleaned up he joined Big Shadow again and then told him about the man. The description Bull Chief gave Big Shadow of the man led Big Shadow to believe this man was his father, Morning Star.

=== Accomplishments ===
From that day Bull Chief had his vision of "Morning Star" forward, he began to dress the way in which the man from his vision did because he believed this spirit was the source of his guidance and protection leading to his long life and many honors. Three of his first coups were against the Sioux, one of the enemies of the Apsaroke tribe, and two of his first coups were on Indians killed by white men, but these coups according to Bull Chief were, "Not good." Bull Chief recounted memories of how he captured guns three times from enemies who were, "Alive and shooting at him." He remembered taking two revolvers and a bow from a Sioux Indian and also capturing two tethered horses.

Bull Chief never led any war-parties out of camp, but on four occasions he did take detachment parties trying to return home, and with them always returned home with undisputed honor. On three separate occasions Bull Chief dismounted his horse during battle and single-handedly managed to hold the opposing company back. During his lifetime, up until he had his interview with Edward S. Curtis, Bull Chief killed three Sioux, two Nez Percés, one Shoshoni, and two Piegan. He was a member of Never Shoots, Packs Game clan, and Fox organization. Although Bull Chief decided to never accept the lance of the Fox organization, they had him as the head of their processional four times, showing he was the bravest man present.
