= Crow people =

Indigenous ethnic group in North America

Crow Tribe of Montana
Apsáalooke
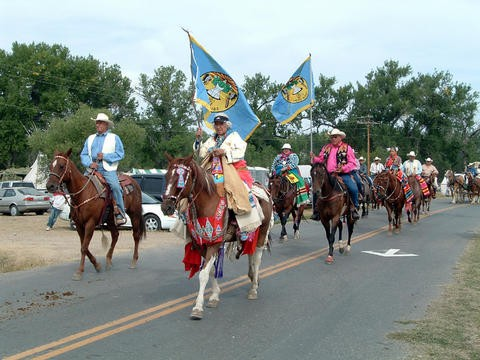
- Pauline Small on horseback. She carries the flag of the Crow Tribe of Montana. As a tribal official, she is entitled to carry the flag during the Crow Fair parade.

Total population
- 12,000 enrolled citizens

Regions with significant populations
- United States (Montana)

Languages
- Crow, English, Plains Sign Talk

Religion
- Christianity, Crow Way, Tobacco Society

Related ethnic groups
- Hidatsa

Apsáalooke "children of the raven"
- People: Apsáalooke
- Language: Apsáalooke aliláau Apsáalooke iiéhkuua
- Country: Apsáalooke Issawua

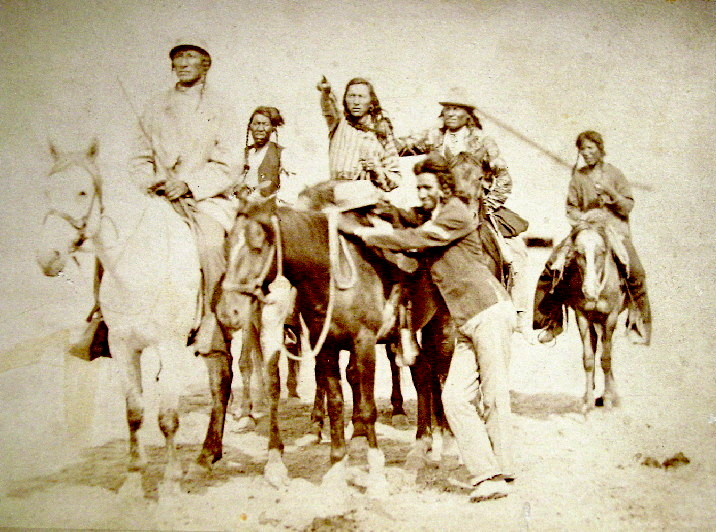
Crow Indians, c. 1878–1883

The Crow, whose autonym is Apsáalooke (Crow pronunciation: [ə̀ˈpsáːɾòːɡè]), are Native Americans living primarily in southern Montana. Today, the Crow people have a federally recognized tribe, the Crow Tribe of Montana, with an Indian reservation, the Crow Indian Reservation, located in the south-central part of the state.

Crow Native Americans are a Plains tribe, who speak the Crow language, part of the Missouri River Valley branch of Siouan languages. Of the 14,000 enrolled tribal citizens, an estimated 3,000 spoke the Crow language in 2007.

In historical times, the Crow lived in the Yellowstone River valley, which extends from present-day Wyoming, through Montana, and into North Dakota, where it joins the Missouri River. During the United States' expansion into the West, the Crow allied with the Americans against their neighbors and rivals, the Dakota, Lakota, and Cheyenne.

Since the 19th century, Crow people have been concentrated on their reservation established south of Billings, Montana. Today, many also live in major Western cities. Their tribal headquarters are located at Crow Agency, Montana. The tribe operates the Little Big Horn College.

== Name ==
The autonym of the tribe, Apsáalooke or Absaroka, (Note: Or Absahrokee, Absaraka, Absarako, Ab-sar-o-ka, Absaroke, Absaroki, Absoroka.) means "children of the large-beaked bird" and was given to them by the Hidatsa, a neighboring and related Siouan-speaking tribe. French interpreters translated the name as gens du corbeau ("people of the crow" or raven), and they became known in English as the Crow. Other tribes also refer to the Apsáalooke as "crow" or "raven" in their own languages. The identity of the bird this name was meant to refer to originally is lost to time, but many Apsáalooké people believe it references the mythical Thunderbird.

== History ==
=== Into the Northern Plains ===
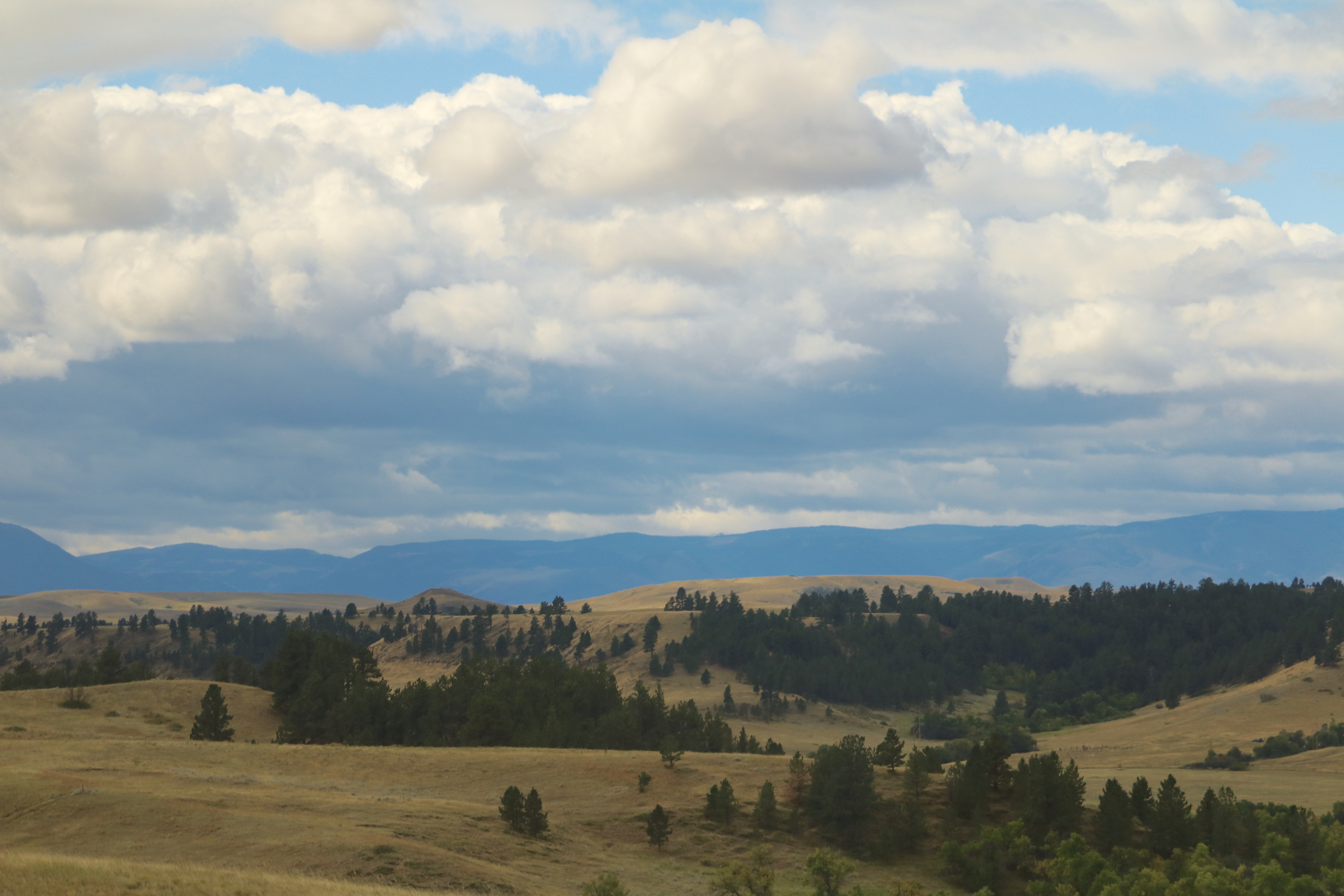
Landscape on the Crow Indian Reservation, Montana

The Crow and related Hidatsa originated in the Ohio Country, south of Lake Erie. They migrated west through Illinois, Minnesota, and settled south of Lake Winnipeg in the 12th or 13th centuries. They grew crops and hunted bison in settled villages, until the mid-16th century when the Ojibwe and Cree drove them further west to the Upper Missouri River.

Later the Crow moved to the Devil's Lake region of North Dakota before the Crow split from the Hidatsa and moved westward in the late 17th century. The Crow were largely pushed westward due to intrusion and influx of the Cheyenne and subsequently the Lakota, also known as the Sioux.

To acquire control of their new territory, the Crow fought against Shoshone bands, such as the Bikkaashe, or "People of the Grass Lodges", and drove them westward. The Crow allied with local Kiowa and Plains Apache bands. The Kiowa and Plains Apache bands later migrated southward, and the Crow remained dominant in their established area through the 18th and 19th centuries, the era of the fur trade.

Their historical territory stretched from what is now Yellowstone National Park and the headwaters of the Yellowstone River (Crow: Iichíilikaashaashe, transl. "Elk River") to the west, north to the Musselshell River (Bishóoshaashe), then northeast to the Yellowstone's mouth at the Missouri River (Áashisee), then southeast to the confluence of the Yellowstone and Powder rivers (Bilápchaashe, transl. "Powder River" or "Ash River"), south along the South Fork of the Powder River, confined in the SE by the Rattlesnake Mountains and westwards in the SW by the Wind River Range. Their tribal area included the river valleys of the Judith River (Buluhpáashe, or "Plum River"), Powder River, Tongue River (Déesaashe), Big Horn River (Iisaxpúatahcheeaashe), and Wind River (Hucháashe), as well as the Bighorn Mountains (Iisiaxpúatachee Isawaxaawúua), Pryor Mountains (Baahpuuo Isawaxaawúua), Wolf Mountains (Cheétiish, or "Wolf Teeth Mountains") and Absaroka Range (Awaxaawé Báaxxiio, also called Absalaga Mountains).

Once established in the Valley of the Yellowstone River and its tributaries on the Northern Plains in Montana and Wyoming, the Crow divided into four groups: the Mountain Crow, River Crow, Kicked in the Bellies, and Beaver Dries its Fur. Formerly semi-nomad hunters and farmers in the northeastern woodland, they adapted to the nomadic lifestyle of the Plains Indians as hunters and gatherers, and hunted bison. Before 1700, they were using dog travois for carrying goods.

=== Enemies and allies ===
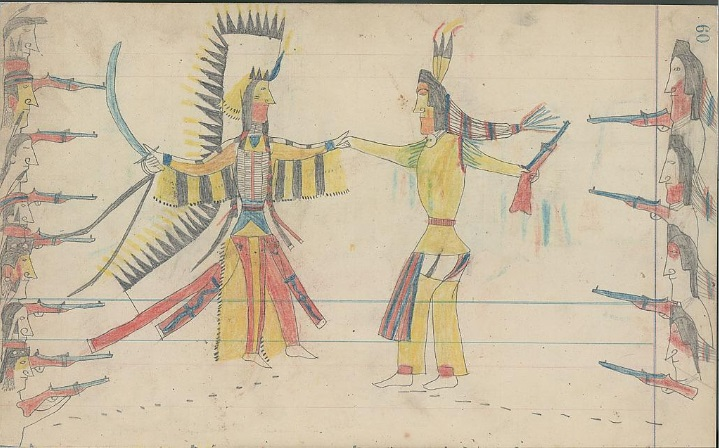
1880 Ledger drawing of a Cheyenne war chief and warriors (left) coming to a truce with a Crow war chief and warriors (right)

From about 1730, the Plains tribes rapidly adopted the horse, which allowed them to move out on to the Plains and hunt buffalo more effectively. However, the severe winters in the North kept their herds smaller than those of Plains tribes in the South. The Crow, Hidatsa, Eastern Shoshone, and Northern Shoshone soon became noted as horse breeders and dealers and developed relatively large horse herds. At the time, other eastern and northern tribes were also moving on to the Plains, in search of game for the fur trade, bison, and more horses. The Crow were subject to raids and horse thefts by horse-poor tribes, including the powerful Blackfoot, Gros Ventre, Assiniboine, Pawnee, and Ute. Later they had to face the Lakota and their allies, the Arapaho and Cheyenne, who also stole horses from their enemies. Their greatest enemies became the tribes of the Blackfoot Confederacy and the Lakota-Cheyenne-Arapaho alliance.

In the 18th century, pressured by the Saulteaux and Cree peoples (the Iron Confederacy), who had earlier and better access to guns through the fur trade, the Crow had migrated to this area from the Ohio Eastern Woodland area of present-day Ohio, settling south of Lake Winnipeg. From there, they were pushed to the west by the Cheyenne. Both the Crow and the Cheyenne were pushed farther west by the Lakota, who took over the territory west of the Missouri River, reaching past the Black Hills of South Dakota to the Big Horn Mountains of Wyoming and Montana. The Cheyenne eventually became allies of the Lakota, as they sought to expel European Americans from the area. The Crow remained bitter enemies of both the Sioux and Cheyenne. They managed to retain a large reservation of more than 9300 km^{2} despite territorial losses, due in part to their cooperation with the federal government against their traditional enemies, the Sioux and Blackfoot. Many other tribes were forced onto much smaller reservations far from their traditional lands.

The Crow were generally friendly with the northern Plains tribes of the Bitterroot Salish (although sometimes they had conflicts); Nez Perce, Kutenai, Shoshone, Kiowa, and Plains Apache. The powerful Iron Confederacy (Nehiyaw-Pwat), an alliance of northern plains Indian nations based around the fur trade, developed as enemies of the Crow. It was named after the dominating Plains Cree and Assiniboine peoples, and later included the Nakoda, Saulteaux, and Métis.

=== Historical subgroups ===
By the early 19th century, the Apsáalooke fell into three independent groupings, who came together only for common defense:

- Ashalahó ('Many Lodges', today called Mountain Crow), Awaxaawaxammilaxpáake ('Mountain People'), or Ashkúale ('The Center Camp'). The Ashalaho or Mountain Crow, the largest Crow group, split from the Awatixa Hidatsa and were the first to travel west. (McCleary 1997: 2–3)., (Bowers 1992: 21) Their leader No Intestines had received a vision and led his band on a long migratory search for sacred tobacco, finally settling in southeastern Montana. They lived in the Rocky Mountains and foothills along the Upper Yellowstone River, on the present-day Wyoming-Montana border, in the Big Horn and Absaroka Range (also Absalaga Mountains); the Black Hills comprised the eastern edge of their territory.
- Binnéessiippeele ('Those Who Live Amongst the River Banks'), today called River Crow or Ashshipíte ('The Black Lodges') The Binnéessiippeele, or River Crow, split from the Hidatsa proper, according to tradition because of a dispute over a bison stomach. As a result, the Hidatsa called the Crow Gixáa-iccá—"Those Who Pout Over Tripe". They lived along the Yellowstone and Musselshell rivers south of the Missouri River and in the river valleys of the Big Horn, Powder and Wind rivers. This area was historically known as the Powder River Country. They sometimes traveled north up to the Milk River.
- Eelalapiío (Kicked in the Bellies) or Ammitaalasshé (Home Away From The center, that is, away from the Ashkúale – "Mountain Crow"). They claimed the area known as the Bighorn Basin, from the Bighorn Mountains in the east to the Absaroka Range to the west, and south to the Wind River Range in northern Wyoming. Sometimes they settled in the Owl Creek Mountains, Bridger Mountains and along the Sweetwater River in the south.

Apsaalooke oral history describes a fourth group, the Bilapiluutche ("Beaver Dries its Fur"), who may have merged with the Kiowa in the second half of the 17th century.

=== Gradual displacement from tribal lands ===
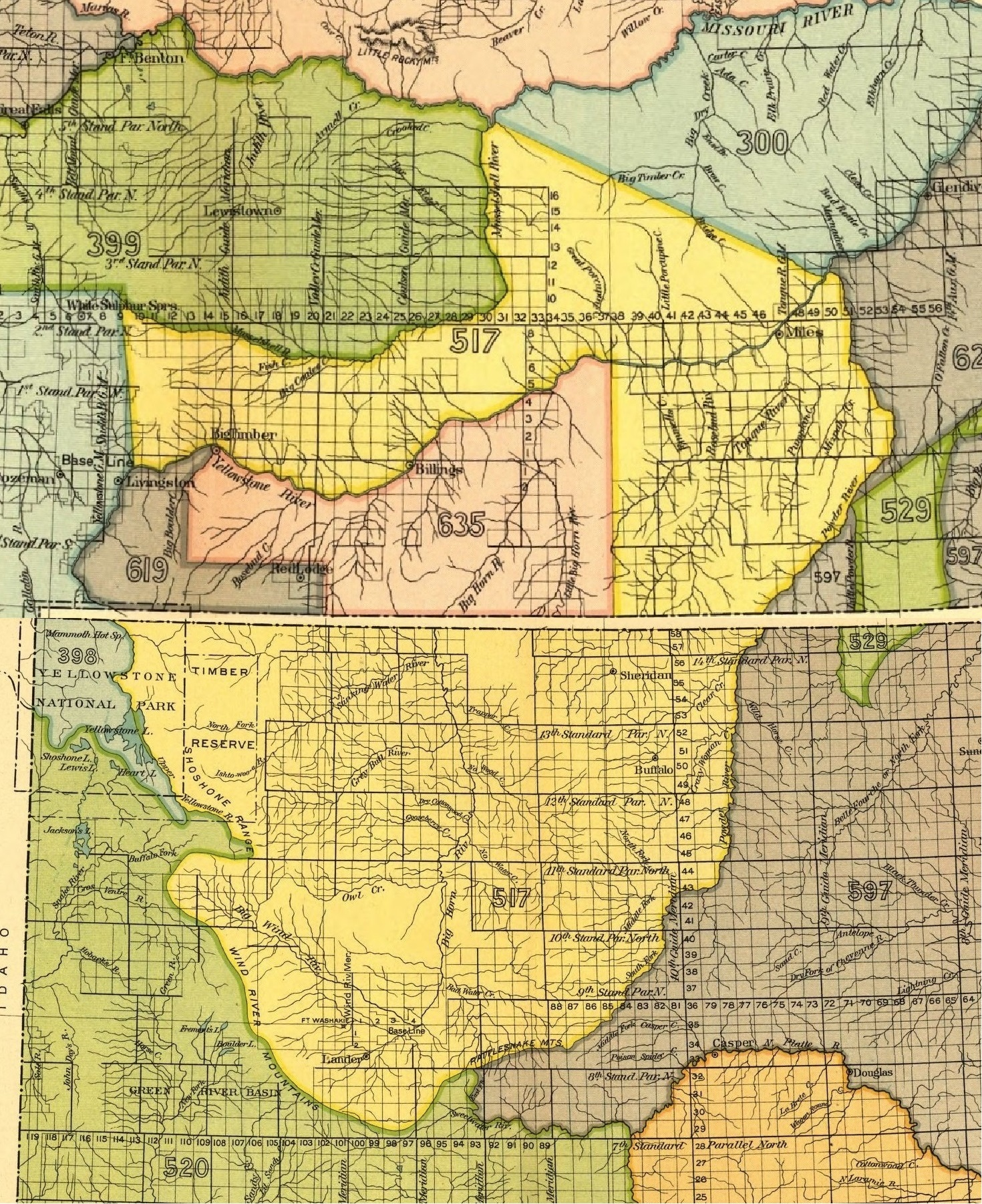
Crow Indian territory (areas 517, 619 and 635) as described in Fort Laramie treaty (1851), present Montana and Wyoming

When European Americans arrived in numbers, the Crows were resisting pressure from enemies who greatly outnumbered them. In the 1850s, a vision by Plenty Coups, then a boy, but who later became their greatest chief, was interpreted by tribal elders as meaning that the whites would become dominant over the entire country, and that the Crow, if they were to retain any of their land, would need to remain on good terms with the whites.

By 1851, the more numerous Lakota and Cheyenne were established just to the south and east of Crow territory in Montana. These enemy tribes coveted the hunting lands of the Crow and warred against them. By right of conquest, they took over the eastern hunting lands of the Crow, including the Powder and Tongue River valleys, and pushed the less numerous Crow to the west and northwest upriver on the Yellowstone. After about 1860, the Lakota Sioux claimed all the former Crow lands from the Black Hills of South Dakota to the Big Horn Mountains of Montana. They demanded that the Americans deal with them regarding any intrusion into these areas.

The Treaty of Fort Laramie of 1851 with the United States confirmed as Crow lands a large area centered on the Big Horn Mountains: the area ran from the Big Horn Basin on the west, to the Musselshell River on the north, and east to the Powder River; it included the Tongue River basin. But for two centuries the Cheyenne and many bands of Lakota Sioux had been steadily migrating westward across the plains, and were still pressing hard on the Crows.

Red Cloud's War (1866–1868) was a challenge by the Lakota Sioux to the United States military presence on the Bozeman Trail, a route along the eastern edge of the Big Horn Mountains to the Montana gold fields. Red Cloud's War ended with victory for the Lakota. The Treaty of Fort Laramie of 1868 with the United States confirmed the Lakota control over all the high plains from the Black Hills of the Dakotas westward across the Powder River Basin to the crest of the Big Horn Mountains. Thereafter bands of Lakota Sioux led by Sitting Bull, Crazy Horse, Gall, and others, along with their Northern Cheyenne allies, hunted and raided throughout the length and breadth of eastern Montana and northeastern Wyoming, which had been for a time ancestral Crow territory.

On 25 June 1876, the Lakota Sioux and Cheyenne achieved a major victory over army forces under Lieutenant Colonel George Armstrong Custer at the Battle of the Little Big Horn in the Crow Indian Reservation, but the Great Sioux War (1876–1877) ended in the defeat of the Sioux and their Cheyenne allies. Crow warriors enlisted with the U.S. Army for this war. The Sioux and allies were forced from eastern Montana and Wyoming: some bands fled to Canada, while others suffered forced removal to distant reservations, primarily in present-day Montana and Nebraska west of the Missouri River.

In 1918, the Crow organized a gathering to display their culture, and they invited members of other tribes. The Crow Fair is now celebrated yearly on the third weekend of August, with wide participation from other tribes.

=== Crow Tribe history: a chronological record ===
==== 1600–1699 ====
A group of Crow went west after leaving the Hidatsa villages of earth lodges in the Knife River and Heart River area (present North Dakota) around 1675–1700. They selected a site for a single earth lodge on the lower Yellowstone River. Most families lived in tipis or other perishable kinds of homes at the new place. These Indians had left the Hidatsa villages and adjacent cornfields for good, but they had yet to become "real" buffalo hunting Crow following the herds on the open plains. Archaeologists know this "proto-Crow" site in present Montana as the Hagen site.

==== 1700–1799 ====
Some time before 1765, the Crow held a Sun Dance, attended by a poor Arapaho. A Crow with power gave him a medicine doll, and he quickly earned status and owned horses as no one else. During the next Sun Dance, some Crow stole back the figure to keep it in the tribe. Eventually the Arapaho made a duplicate. Later in life, he married a Kiowa woman and brought the doll with him. The Kiowas use it during the Sun Dance and recognize it as one of the most powerful tribal medicines. They still credit the Crow tribe for the origin of their sacred Tai-may figure.

==== 1800–1824 ====
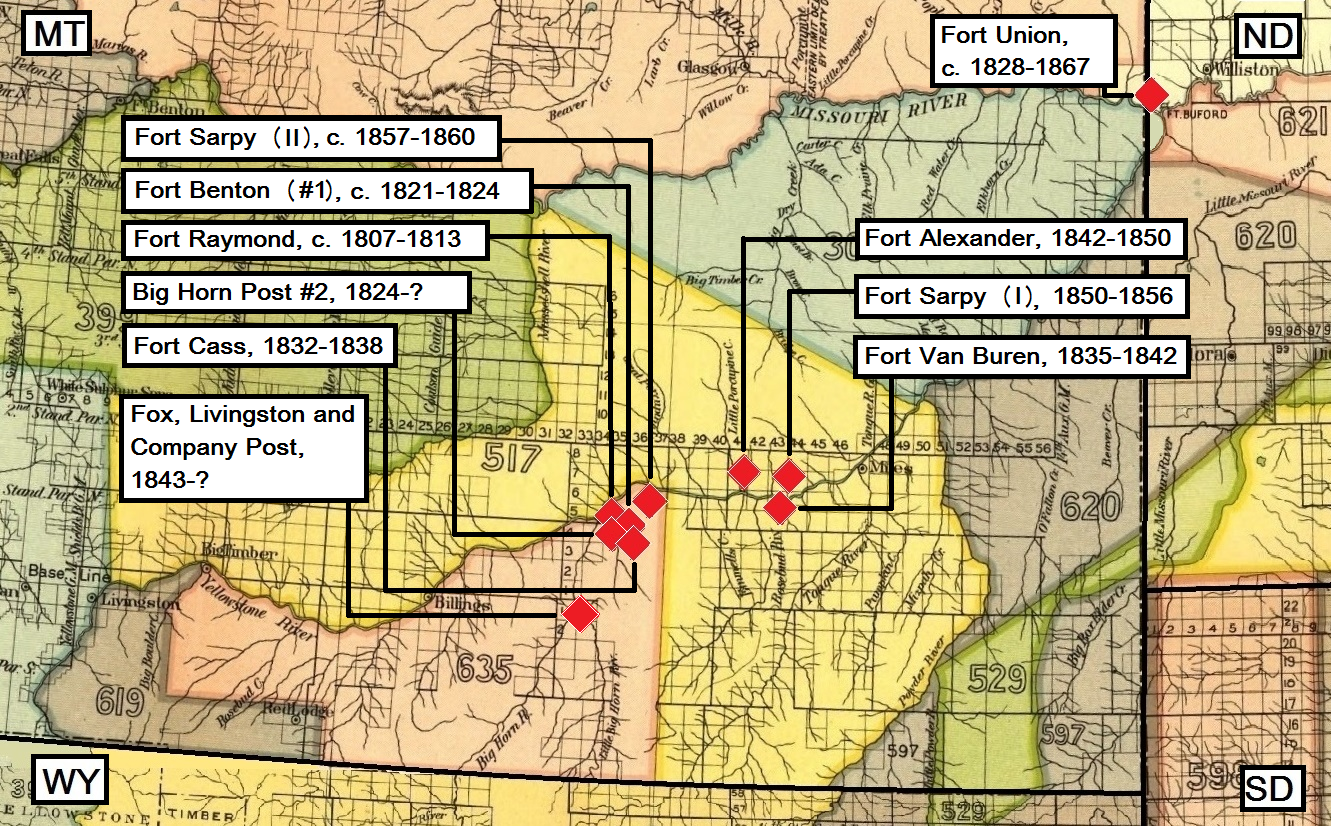
The trading posts built for trade with the Crows

The enmity between the Crow and the Lakota was reasserted from the start of the 19th century. The Crow killed a minimum of thirty Lakota in 1800–1801 according to two Lakota winter counts. The next year, the Lakota and their Cheyenne allies killed all the men in a Crow camp with thirty tipis.

In the summer of 1805, a Crow camp traded at the Hidatsa villages on Knife River in present North Dakota. Chiefs Red Calf and Spotted Crow allowed the fur trader Francois-Antoine Larocque to join it on its way across the plains to the Yellowstone area. He traveled with it to a point west of the place where Billings, Montana, is today. The camp crossed Little Missouri River and Bighorn River on the way.

The next year, some Crow discovered a group of whites with horses on the Yellowstone River. By stealth, they captured the mounts before morning. The Lewis and Clark Expedition did not see the Crow.

The first trading post in Crow country was constructed in 1807, known as both Fort Raymond and Fort Lisa (1807–ca. 1813). Like the succeeding forts, Fort Benton (ca. 1821–1824) and Fort Cass (1832–1838), it was built near the confluence of the Yellowstone and the Bighorn.

The Blood Blackfoot Bad Head's winter count tells about the early and persistent hostility between the Crow and the Blackfoot. In 1813, a force of Blood warriors set off for a raid on the Crow in the Bighorn area. Next year, Crows near Little Bighorn River killed Blackfoot Top Knot.

A Crow camp neutralized thirty Cheyenne bent on capturing horses in 1819. The Cheyenne and warriors from a Lakota camp destroyed a whole Crow camp at Tongue River the following year. This was likely the most severe attack on a Crow camp in historic time.

==== 1825–1849 ====
The Crows put up 300 tipis near a Mandan village on the Missouri in 1825. The representatives of the US government waited for them. Mountain Crow chief Long Hair (Red Plume at Forehead) and fifteen other Crows signed the first treaty of friendship and trade between the Crows and the United States on 4 August. With the signing of the document, the Crows also recognized the supremacy of the United States, if they actually understood the word. River Crow chief Arapooish had left the treaty area in disgust. By help of the thunderbird he had to send a farewell shower down on the whites and the Mountain Crows.

In 1829, seven Crow warriors were neutralized by Blood Blackfoot Indians led by Spotted Bear, who captured a pipe-hatchet during the fight just west of Chinook, Montana.

In the summer of 1834, the Crow (maybe led by chief Arapooish) tried to shut down Fort McKenzie at the Missouri in Blackfeet country. The apparent motive was to stop the trading post's sale to their Indian enemies. Although later described as a month long siege of the fort, it lasted only two days. The opponents exchanged a few shots and the men in the fort fired a cannon, but no real harm came to anyone. The Crows left four days before the arrival of a Blackfeet band. The episode seems to be the worst armed conflict between the Crows and a group of whites until the Sword Bearer uprising in 1887.

The death of chief Arapooish was recorded on 17 September 1834. The news reached Fort Clark at the Mandan village Mitutanka. Manager F.A. Chardon wrote he "was Killed by Black feet".

The smallpox epidemic of 1837 spread along the Missouri and "had little impact" on the tribe according to one source. The River Crows grew in number, when a group of Hidatsas joined them permanently to escape the scourge sweeping through the Hidatsa villages.

Fort Van Buren was a short-lived trading post in existence from 1839 to 1842. It was built on the bank of the Yellowstone near the mouth of Tongue River.

In the summer of 1840, a Crow camp in the Bighorn valley greeted the Jesuit missionary Pierre-Jean De Smet.

From 1842 to around 1852, the Crow traded in Fort Alexander opposite the mouth of the Rosebud.

The River Crows charged a moving Blackfeet camp near Judith Gap in 1845. Father Pierre-Jean De Smet mourned the destructive attack on the "petite Robe" band. The Blackfeet chief Small Robe had been mortally wounded and many killed. De Smet worked out the number of women and children taken captive to 160. By and by and with a fur trader as an intermediary, the Crows agreed to let 50 women return to their tribe.

==== 1850–1874 ====
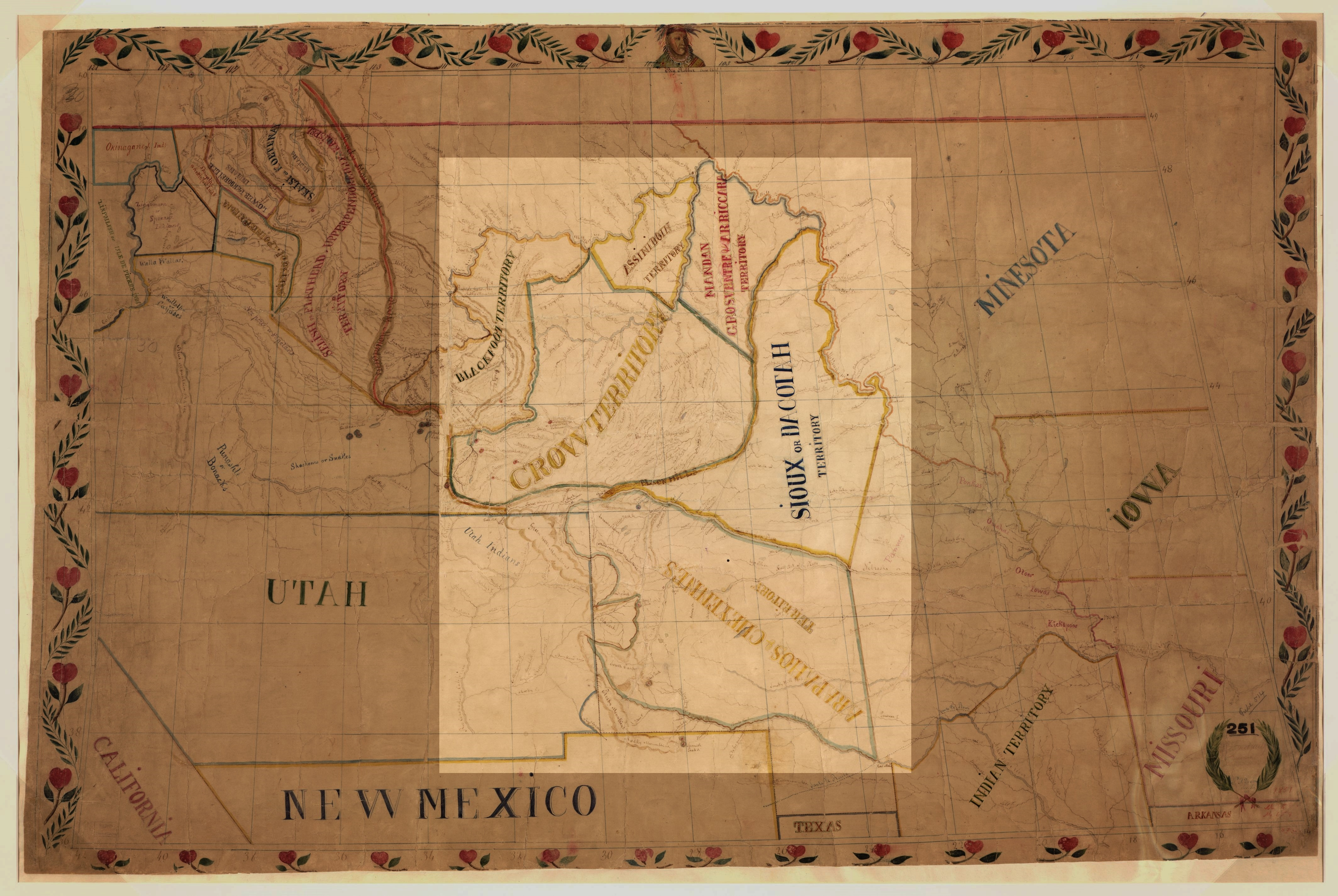
De Smet map of the 1851 Fort Laramie Indian territories (the light area). Jesuit missionary De Smet drew this map with the tribal borders agreed upon at Fort Laramie in 1851. Although the map itself is wrong in certain ways, it has the Crow territory west of the Sioux territory as written in the treaty, and the Bighorn area as the heart of the Crow country.

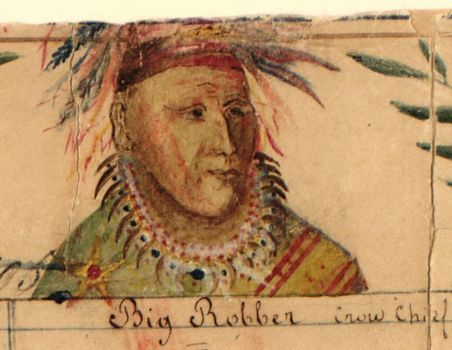
Crow Indian Chief Big Shadow (Big Robber), signer of the Fort Laramie treaty (1851). Painting by Jesuit missionary De Smet.

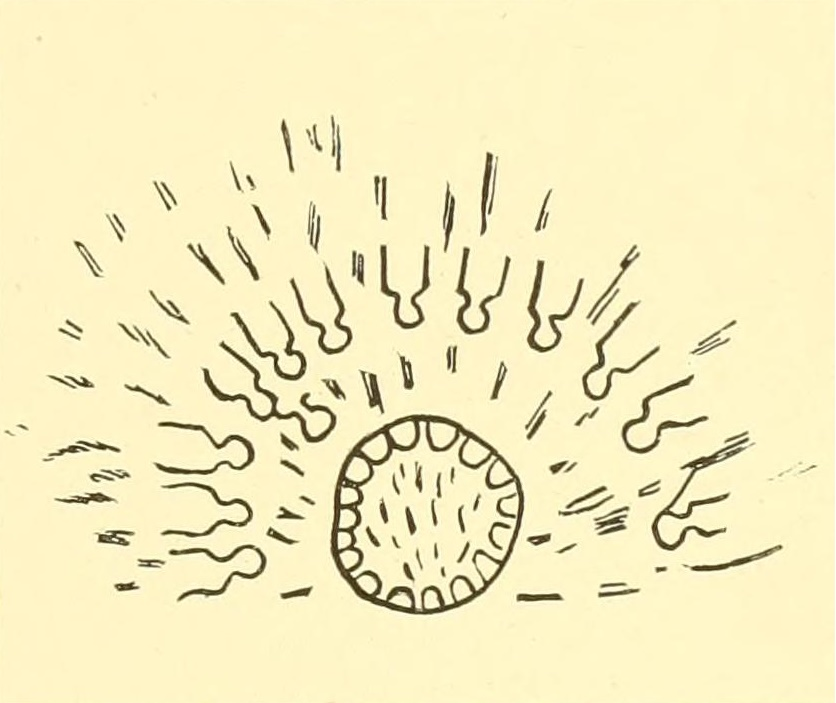
Lone Dog's Sioux winter count, 1870. Thirty Crows killed in battle.

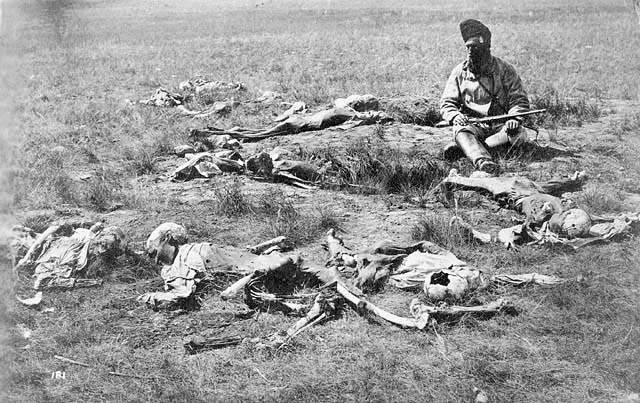
1874 photograph of Crow Indians killed and scalped by Piegan Blackfeet in winter of 1873

Fort Sarpy (I) near Rosebud River carried out trade with the Crow after the closing of Fort Alexander. River Crow went some times to the bigger Fort Union at the confluence of the Yellowstone and the Missouri. Both the "famous Absaroka amazon" Woman Chief and River Crow chief Twines His Tail (Rotten Tail) visited the fort in 1851.

In 1851, the Crow, the Sioux, and six other Indian nations signed the Fort Laramie treaty along with the U.S. It should ensure peace forever between all nine partakers. Further, the treaty described the different tribal territories. The U.S. was allowed to construct roads and forts. A weak point in the treaty was the absence of rules to uphold the tribal borders.

The Crow and various bands of Sioux attacked each other again from the mid-1850s. Soon, the Sioux took no notice of the 1851 borders and expanded into Crow territory west of the Powder. The Crows engaged in "… large-scale battles with invading Sioux …" near present-day Wyola, Montana. Around 1860, the western Powder area was lost.

From 1857 to 1860, many Crow traded their surplus robes and skin at Fort Sarpy (II) near the mouth of the Bighorn River.

During the mid-1860s, the Sioux resented the emigrant route Bozeman Trail through the Powder River bison habitat, although it mainly "crossed land guaranteed to the Crows". When the Army built forts to protect the trail, the Crow cooperated with the garrisons. On 21 December 1866, the Sioux, Cheyenne, and Arapaho defeated Captain William J. Fetterman and his men from Fort Phil Kearny. Evidently, the U.S. could not enforce respect for the treaty borders agreed upon 15 years before.

The River Crow north of the Yellowstone developed a friendship with their former Gros Ventre enemies in the 1860s. A joint large-scale attack on a large Blackfoot camp at the Cypress Hills in 1866 resulted in a chaotic withdrawal of the Gros Ventres and Crow. The Blackfoot pursued the warriors for hours and killed allegedly more than 300.

In 1868, a new Fort Laramie treaty between the Sioux and the U.S. turned 1851 Crow Powder River area into "unceded Indian territory" of the Sioux. "The Government had in effect betrayed the Crows…". On 7 May, the same year, the Crow ceded vast ranges to the US due to pressure from white settlements north of Upper Yellowstone River and loss of eastern territories to the Sioux. They accepted a smaller reservation south of the Yellowstone.

The Sioux and their Indian allies, now formally at peace with the U.S., focused on intertribal wars at once. Raids against the Crows were "frequent, both by the Northern Cheyennes and by the Arapahos, as well as the Sioux, and by parties made up from all three tribes". Crow chief Plenty Coups recalled, "The three worst enemies our people had were combined against us …".

In April 1870, the Sioux overpowered a barricaded war group of 30 Crow in the Big Dry area. The Crow were killed to either last or last but one man. Later, mourning Crow with "their hair cut off, their fingers and faces cut" brought the dead bodies back to camp. The drawing from the Sioux winter count of Lone Dog shows the Crow in the circle (the breastwork), while the Sioux close in on them. The many lines indicates flying bullets. The Sioux lost 14 warriors. Sioux chief Sitting Bull took part in this battle.

In the summer of 1870, some Sioux attacked a Crow reservation camp in the Bighorn/Little Bighorn area. The Crows reported Sioux Indians in the same area again in 1871. During the next years, this eastern part of the Crow reservation was taken over by the Sioux in search of buffalo. In August 1873, visiting Nez Percé and a Crow reservation camp at Pryor Creek further west faced a force of Sioux warriors in a long confrontation. Crow chief Blackfoot objected to this incursion and called for resolute U.S. military actions against the Indian trespassers. Due to Sioux attacks on both civilians and soldiers north of the Yellowstone in newly established U.S. territory (Battle of Pease Bottom, Battle of Honsinger Bluff), the Commissioner of Indian Affairs advocated the use of troops to force the Sioux back to South Dakota in his 1873 report. Nothing happened.

==== 1875–1899 ====
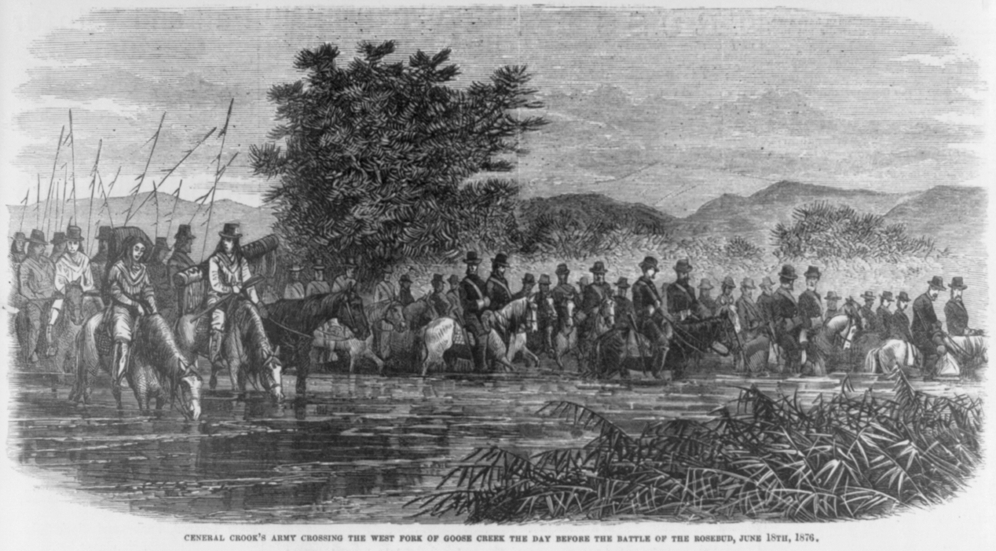
Crooks army before battle of the Rosebud. The Crow and Shoshone scouts and the Army are crossing Goose River on the way to the Rosebud in 1876. The equestrian woman may be either the Crow berdache Finds-them-and-kills-them or the Crow amazon The-other-magpie.

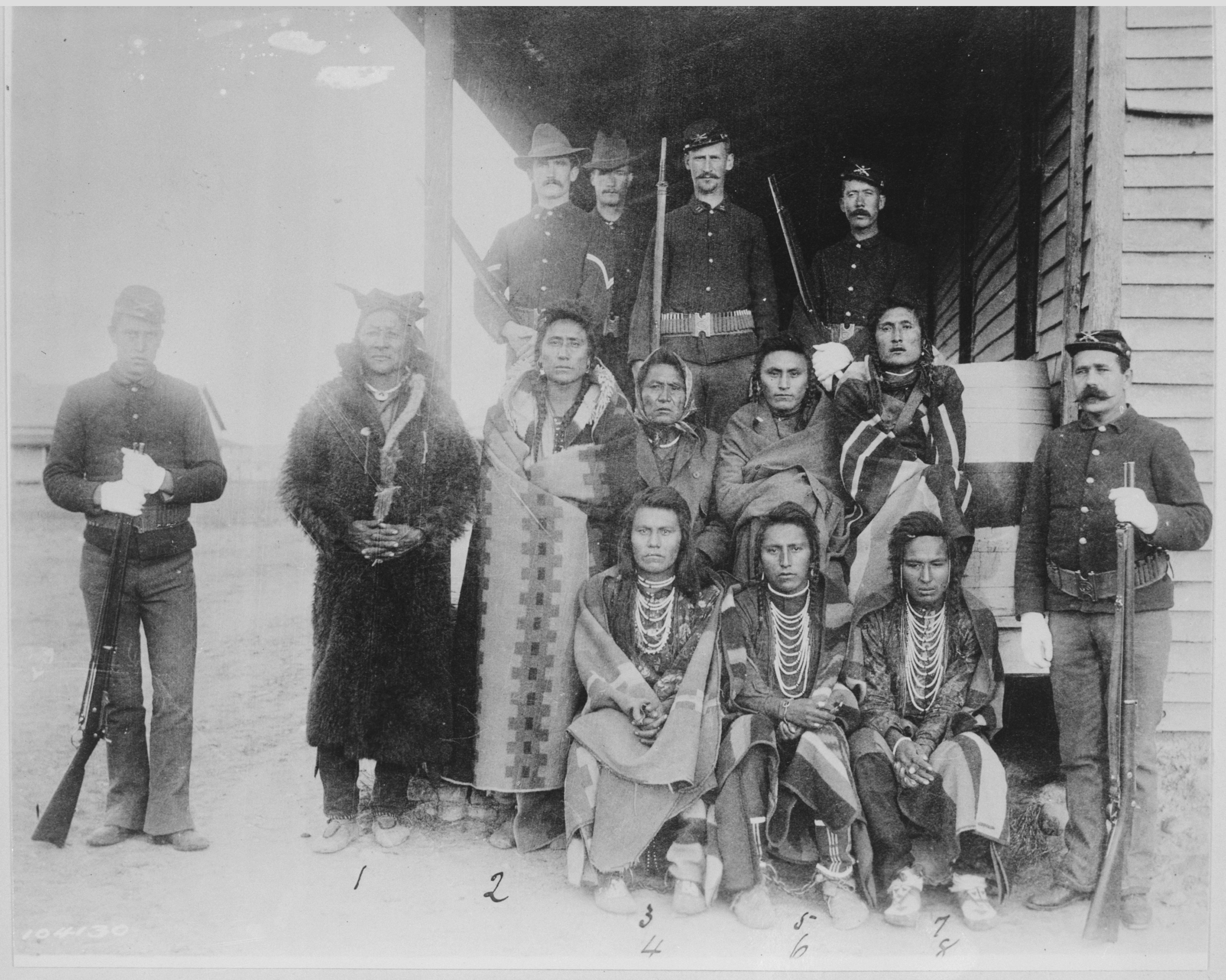
"Eight Crow prisoners under guard at Crow agency, Montana, 1887"

Two years later, in early July 1875, Crow chief Long Horse was killed in a suicidal attack on some Sioux, who previously had killed three soldiers from Camp Lewis on the upper Judith River (near Lewistown). George Bird Grinnell was a member of the exploring party in the Yellowstone National Park that year, and he saw the bringing in of the dead chief. A mule carried the body, which was wrapped in a green blanket. The chief was placed in a tipi "not far from the Crow camp, reclining on his bed covered with robes, his face handsomely painted". Crow woman Pretty Shield remembered the sadness in camp. "We fasted, nearly starved in our sorrow for the loss of Long-Horse."

Exposed to Sioux attacks, the Crows sided with the U.S. during the Great Sioux War in 1876–1877. On 10 April 1876, 23 Crow enlisted as Army scouts. They enlisted against a traditional Indian enemy, "... who were now in the old Crow country, menacing and often raiding the Crows in their reservation camps." Charles Varnum, leader of Custer's scouts, understood how valuable the enrolment of scouts from the local Indian tribe was. "These Crows were in their own country and knew it thoroughly."

Notable Crows like Medicine Crow and Plenty Coups participated in the Rosebud Battle along with more than 160 other Crows.

The Battle of the Little Bighorn stood on the Crow reservation. As most battles between the US and the Sioux in the 1860s and 1870s, "It was a clash of two expanding empires, with the most dramatic battles occurring on lands only recently taken by the Sioux from other tribes." When the Crow camp with Pretty Shield learned about the defeat of George A. Custer, it cried for the assumed dead Crow scouts "… and for Son-of-the-morning-star [Custer] and his blue soldiers …".

On 8 January 1877, three Crow participated in the last battle of the Great Sioux War in the Wolf Mountains.

In the spring of 1878, 700 Crow tipis were pitched at the confluence of Bighorn River and Yellowstone River. Together with Colonel Nelson A. Miles, an Army leader in the Great Sioux War, the large camp celebrated the victory over the Sioux.

In 1882, during the cattle boom, the US government responded to ranchers' demands for more land and pressured the Crow to cede the Western part of their reservation.

== Culture ==
=== Subsistence ===
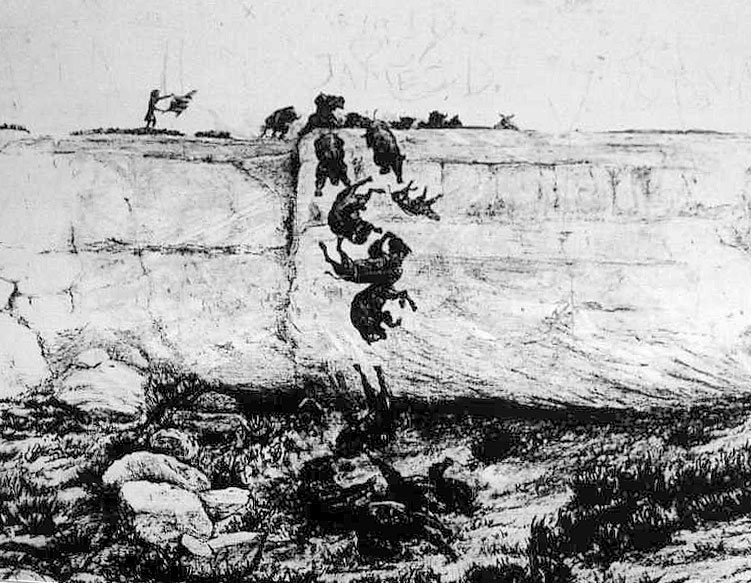
Illustration of a buffalo jump

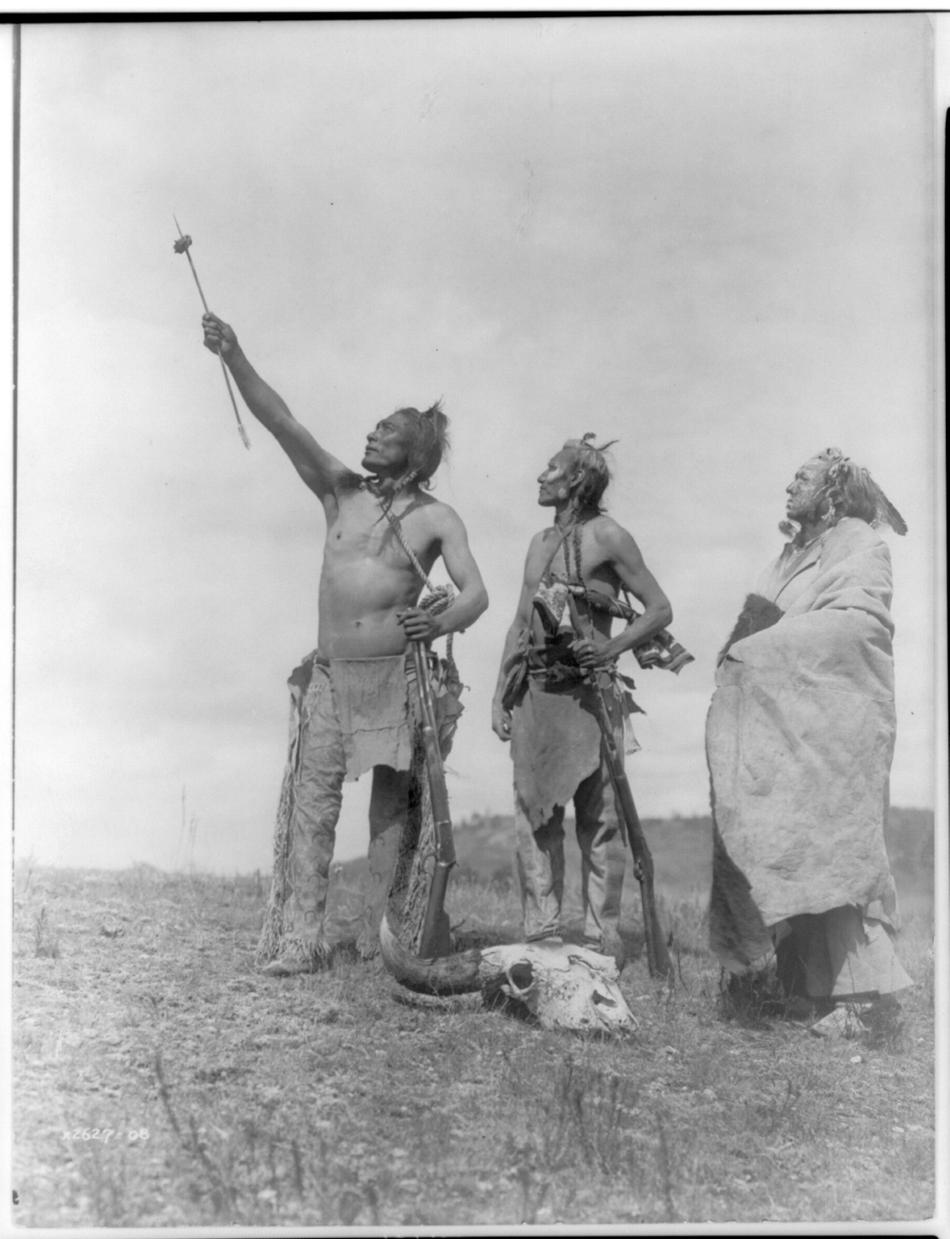
The Oath Apsaroke by Edward S. Curtis depicting Crow men giving a symbolic oath with a bison meat offering on an arrow

The main food source for the Crow was the American bison which was hunted in a variety of ways. Before the use of horses the bison were hunted on foot and required hunters to stalk close to the bison, often with a wolf-pelt disguise, then pursue the animals quickly on foot before killing them with arrows or lances. The horse allowed the Crow to hunt bison more easily as well as hunt more at one time. Riders would panic the herd into a stampede and shoot the targeted animals with arrows or bullets from horseback or lance them through the heart. In addition to bison the Crow also hunted bighorn sheep, mountain goats, deer, elk, bear, and other game. Buffalo meat was often roasted or boiled in a stew with prairie turnips. The rump, tongue, liver, heart, and kidneys all were considered delicacies. Dried bison meat was ground with fat and berries to make pemmican. In addition to meat, wild edibles were gathered and eaten such as elderberries, wild turnip, and Saskatoon berries.

The Crow often hunted bison by utilizing buffalo jumps. "Where Buffaloes are Driven Over Cliffs at Long Ridge" was a favorite spot for meat procurement by the Crow Indians for over a century, from 1700 to around 1870 when modern weapons were introduced. The Crow used this place annually in the autumn, a place of multiple cliffs along a ridge that eventually sloped to the creek. Early in the morning the day of the jump a medicine man would stand on the edge of the upper cliff, facing up the ridge. He would take a pair of bison hindquarters and pointing the feet along the lines of stones he would sing his sacred songs and call upon the Great Spirit to make the operation a success. After this invocation the medicine man would give the two head drivers a pouch of incense. As the two head drivers and their helpers headed up the ridge and the long line of stones they would stop and burn incense on the ground repeating this process four times. The ritual was intended to make the animals come to the line where the incense was burned, then bolt back to the ridge area.

=== Habitation and transportation ===
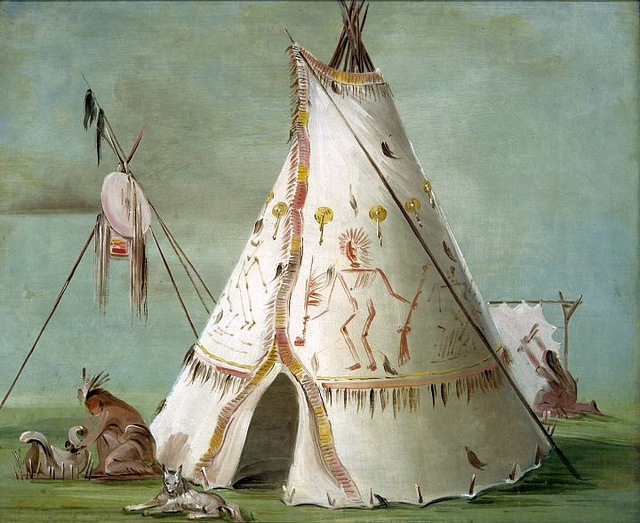
Crow Lodge of Twenty-five Buffalo Skins, 1832–33 by George Catlin

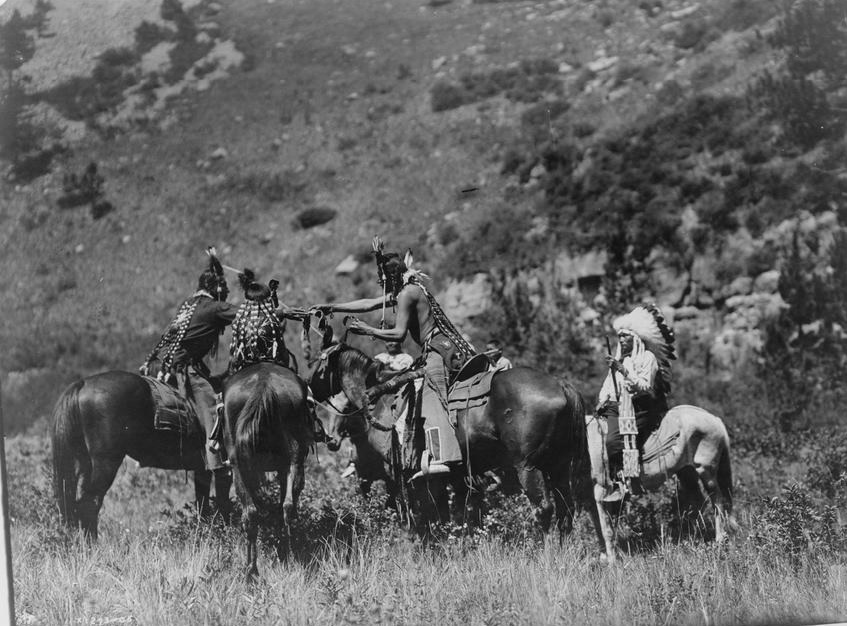
Crow men trading on horseback

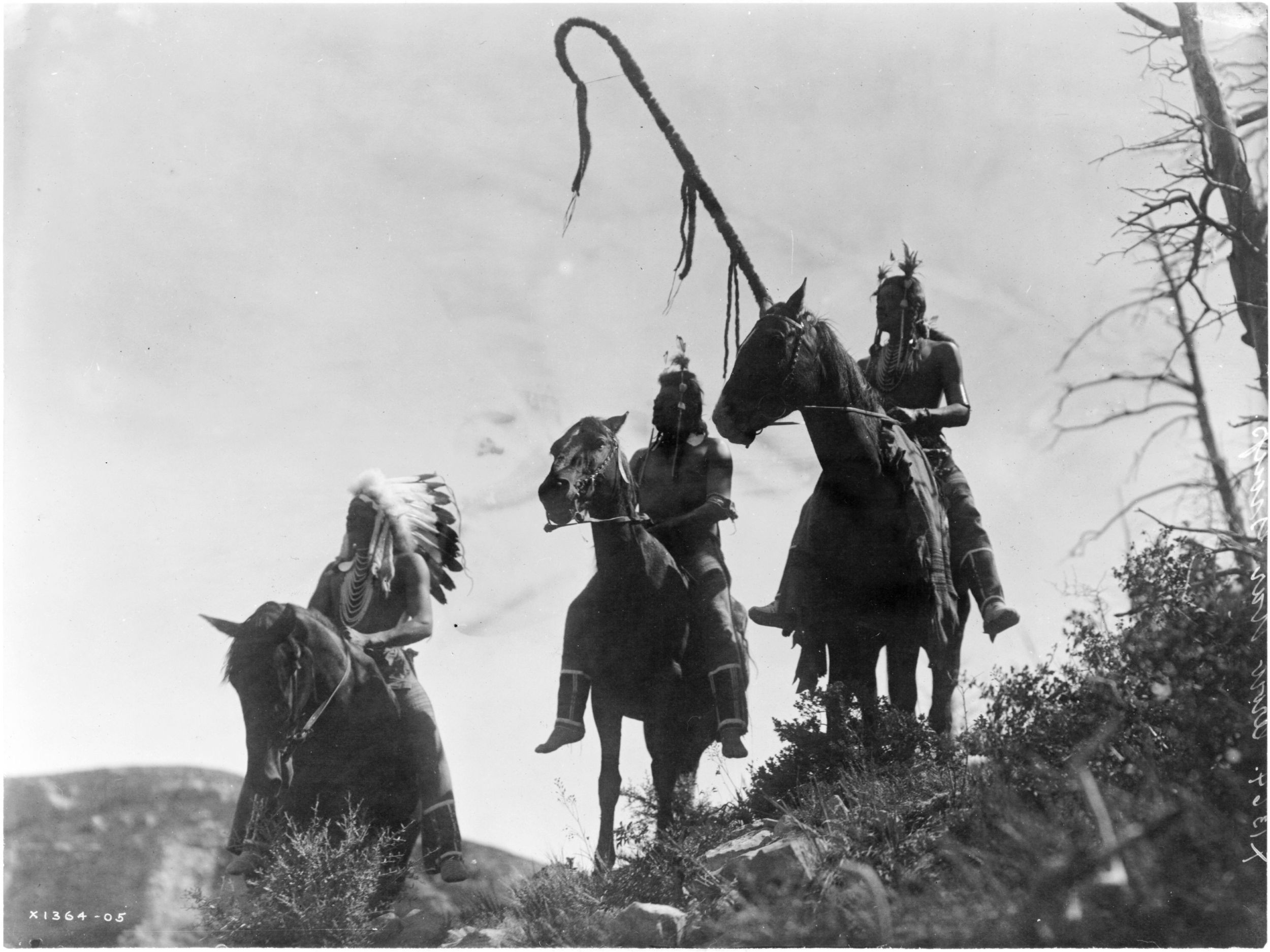
Three Crow men on their horses, Edward S. Curtis, 1908

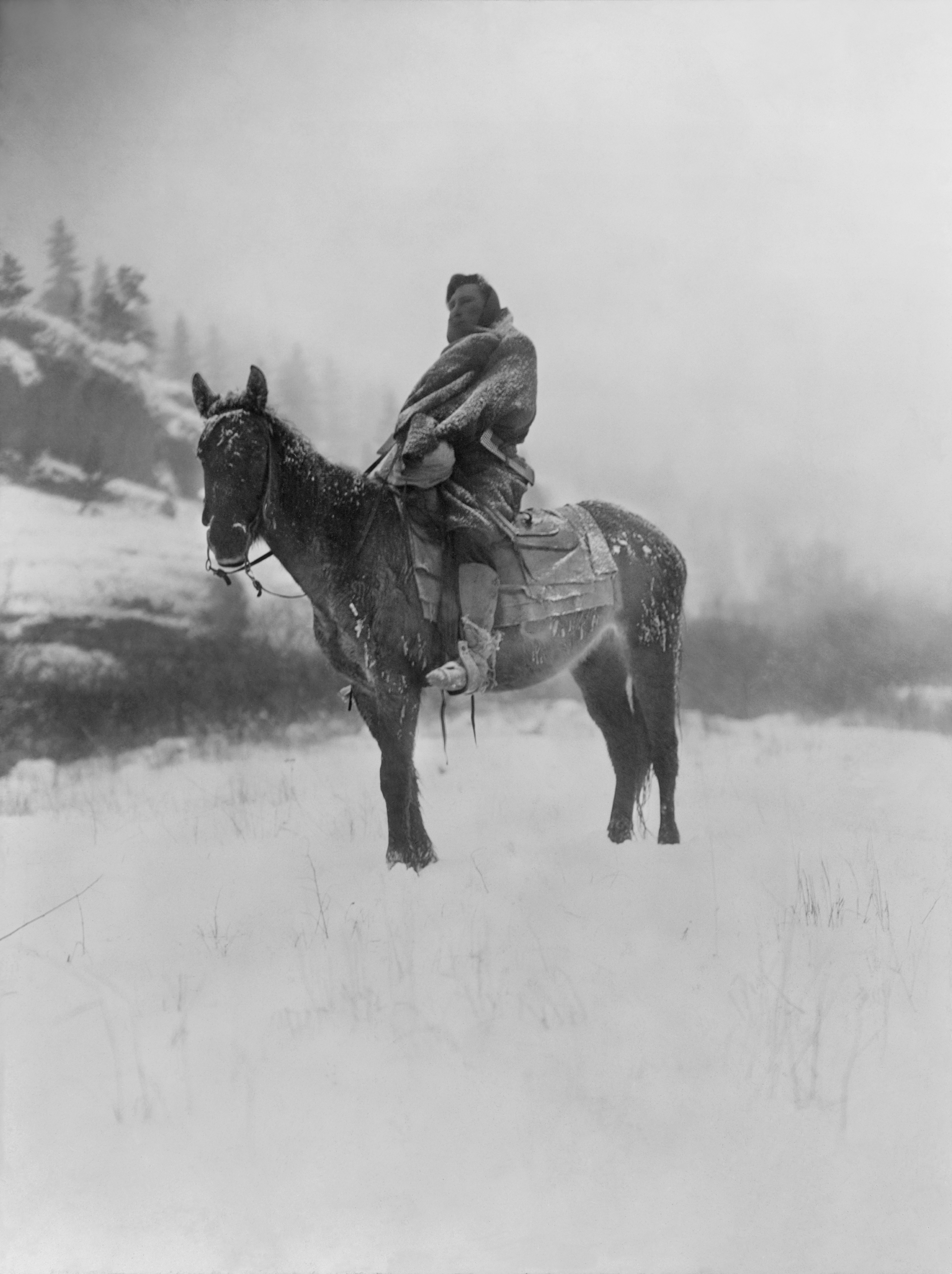
A scout on a horse, 1908 by Edward S. Curtis

The traditional Crow shelter is the tipi or skin lodge made with bison hides stretched over wooden poles. The Crow are historically known to construct some of the largest tipis. Tipi poles were harvested from the lodgepole pine which acquired its name from its use as support for tipis. Inside the tipi, mattresses and buffalo-hide seats were arranged around the edge, with a fireplace in the center. The smoke from the fire escaped through a hole or smoke-flap in the top of the tipi. At least one entrance hole with collapsible flap allowed entry into the tipi. Often paintings adorned the outside and inside of tipis with specific meanings attached to the images. Often specific tipi designs were unique to the individual owner, family, or society that resided in the tipi. Tipis are easily raised and collapsed and are lightweight, which is ideal for nomadic people like the Crow who move frequently and quickly. Once collapsed, the tipi poles are used to create a travois. Travois are a horse-pulled frame structure used by plains Indians to carry and pull belongings as well as small children. Many Crow families still own and use the tipi, especially when traveling. The annual Crow Fair has been described as the largest gathering of tipis in the world.

The most widely used form of transportation used by the Crow was the horse. Horses were acquired through raiding and trading with other Plains nations. People of the northern plains like the Crow mostly got their horses from people from the southern plains such as the Comanche and Kiowa who originally got their horses from the Spanish and southwestern Indians such as the various Pueblo people. The Crow had large horse herds which were among the largest owned by Plains Indians; in 1914 they had approximately thirty to forty thousand head. By 1921 the number of mounts had dwindled to just one thousand. Like other plains people the horse was central to the Crow economy and were a highly valuable trade item and were frequently stolen from other tribes to gain wealth and prestige as a warrior. The horse allowed the Crow to become powerful and skilled mounted warriors, being able to perform daring maneuvers during battle including hanging underneath a galloping horse and shooting arrows by holding onto its mane. They also had many dogs; one source counted five to six hundred. Dogs were used as guards and pack animals to carry belongings and pull travois. The introduction of horses into Crow society allowed them to pull heavier loads faster, greatly reducing the number of dogs used as pack animals.

=== Attire ===
The Crow wore clothing distinguished by gender. Women wore dresses made of deer and buffalo hide, decorated with elk teeth or shells. They covered their legs with leggings during winter and their feet with moccasins. Crow women wore their hair in two braids. Male clothing usually consisted of a shirt, trimmed leggings with a belt, a long breechcloth, and moccasins. Robes made from the furred hide of a bison were often worn in winter. Leggings were either made of animal hide which the Crow made for themselves or made of wool which were highly valued trade items made specifically for Indians in Europe. Their hair was worn long, in some cases reaching the ground. The Crow are famous for often wearing their hair in a pompadour which was often colored with white paint. Crow men were notable for wearing two hair pipes made from beads on both sides of their hair. Men often wore their hair in two braids wrapped in the fur of beavers or otters. Bear grease was used to give shine to hair. Stuffed birds were often worn in the hair of warriors and medicine men. Like other plains Indians the Crow wore feathers from eagles, crows, owls, and other birds in their hair for symbolic reasons. The Crow wore a variety of headdresses including the famous eagle feather headdress, bison scalp headdress with horns and beaded rim, and split horn headdress. The split horn headdress is made from a single bison horn split in half and polished into two nearly identical horns which were attached to a leather cap and decorated with feathers and beadwork. Traditional clothing worn by the Crow is still worn today with varying degrees of regularity.

Crow woman.

Crow man.

The Crow are well known for their intercut beadwork. They adorned basically every aspect of their lives with these beads, giving special attention to ceremonial and ornamental items. Their clothing, horses, cradles, ornamental and ceremonial gear, in addition to leather cases of all shapes, sizes and uses were decorated in beadwork. They gave reverence to the animals they ate by using as much of it as they could. The leather for their clothing, robes and pouches were created from the skin of buffalo, deer and elk. The work was done by the tribeswomen, with some being considered experts and were often sought by the younger, less experienced women for design and symbolic advice. The Crow are an innovative people and are credited with developing their own style of stitch-work for adhering beads. This stitch, which is now called the overlay, is still also known as the "Crow Stitch". In their beadwork, geometric shapes were primarily used with triangles, diamonds and hour-glass structures being the most prevalent. A wide range of colors were utilized by the Crow, but blues and various shades of pink were the most dominantly used. To intensify or to draw out a certain color or shape, they would surround that figure or color in a white outline.

The colors chosen were not just merely used to be aesthetically pleasing, but rather had a deeper symbolic meaning. Pinks represented the various shades of the rising sun with yellow being the East the origin of the sun's arrival. Blues are symbolic of the sky; red represented the setting sun or the West; green symbolizing mother earth, black the slaying of an enemy and white representing clouds, rain or sleet. Although most colors had a common symbolism, each piece's symbolic significance was fairly subjective to its creator, especially when in reference to the individual shapes. One person's triangle might symbolize a teepee, a spear head to a different individual or a range of mountains to yet another. Regardless of the individual significance of each piece, the Crow People give reverence to the land and sky with the symbolic references found in the various colors and shapes found on their ornamental gear and even clothing.

Some of the clothing that the Crow decorated with beads included robes, vests, pants, shirts, moccasins and various forms of celebratory and ceremonial gear. In addition to creating a connection with the land, from which they are a part, the various shapes and colors reflected one's standing and achievements. For example, if a warrior were to slay, wound or disarm an enemy, he would return with a blackened face. The black color would then be incorporated in the clothing of that man, most likely in his war attire. A beaded robe, which was often given to a bride to be, could take over a year to produce and was usually created by the bride's mother-in-law or another female relative-in-law. These robes were often characterized by a series of parallel horizontal lines, usually consisting of light blue. The lines represented the young women's new role as a wife and mother; also the new bride was encouraged to wear the robe at the next ceremonial gathering to symbolize her addition and welcoming to a new family. In modern times, the Crow still often decorate their clothing with intricate bead designs for powwow and everyday clothing.

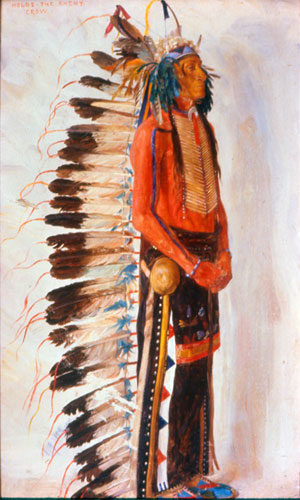
Painting of Holds The Enemy, a Crow warrior with split horn headdress and beaded wool leggings by E. A. Burbank

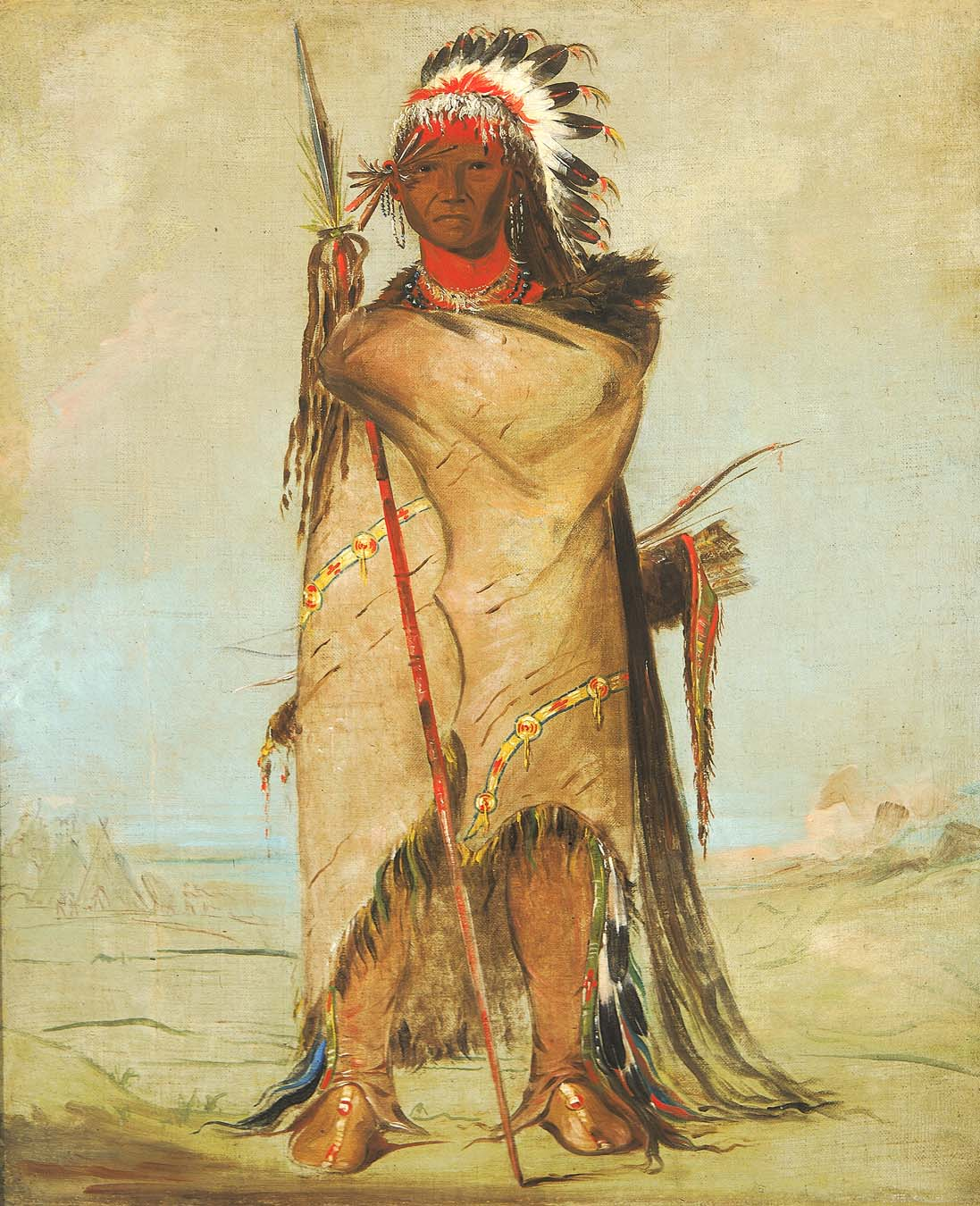
Hó-ra-tó-a, a Crow warrior with headdress, bison robe, and hair reaching the ground. Painted by George Catlin, Fort Union 1832.

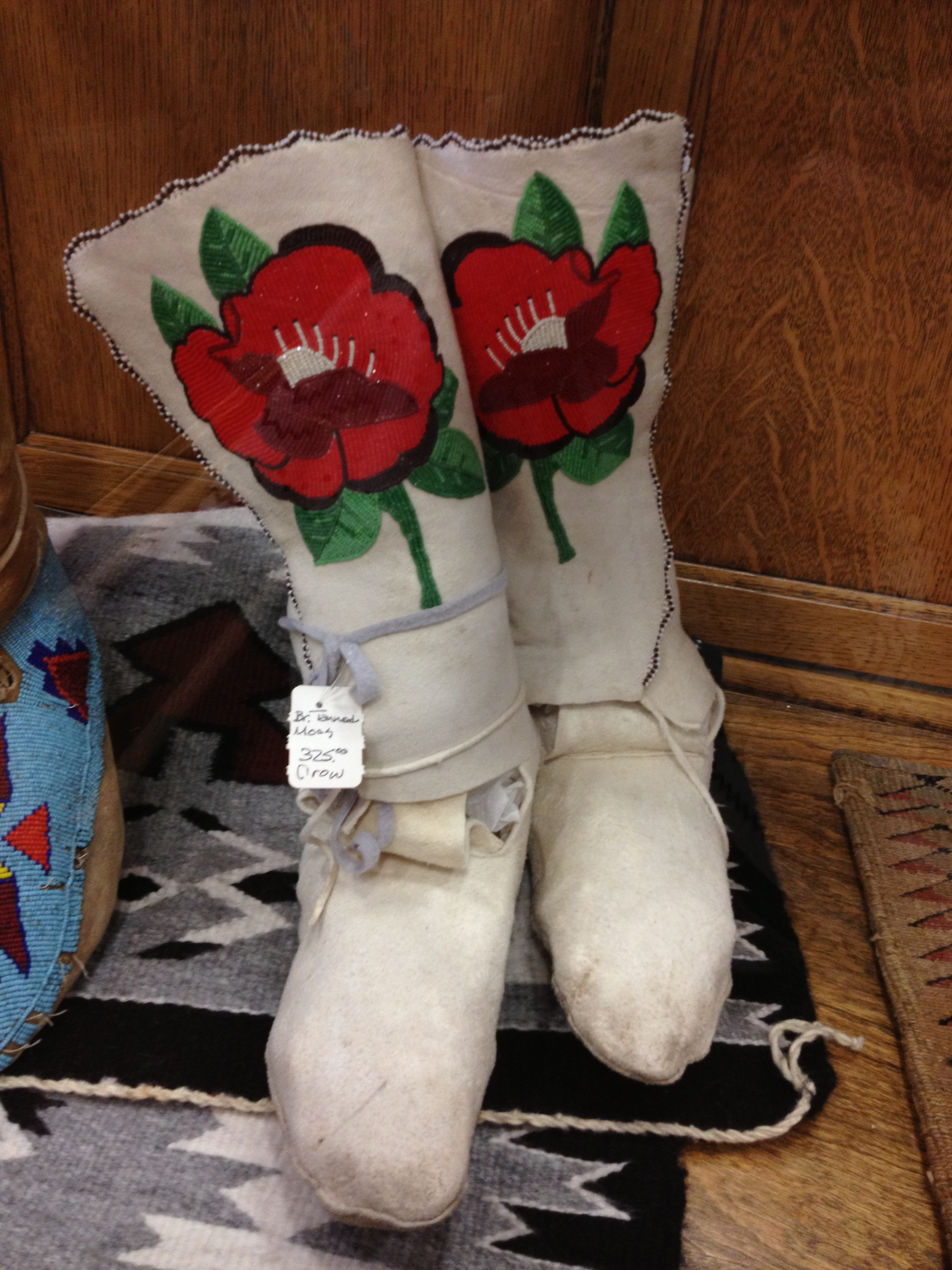
Crow moccasins

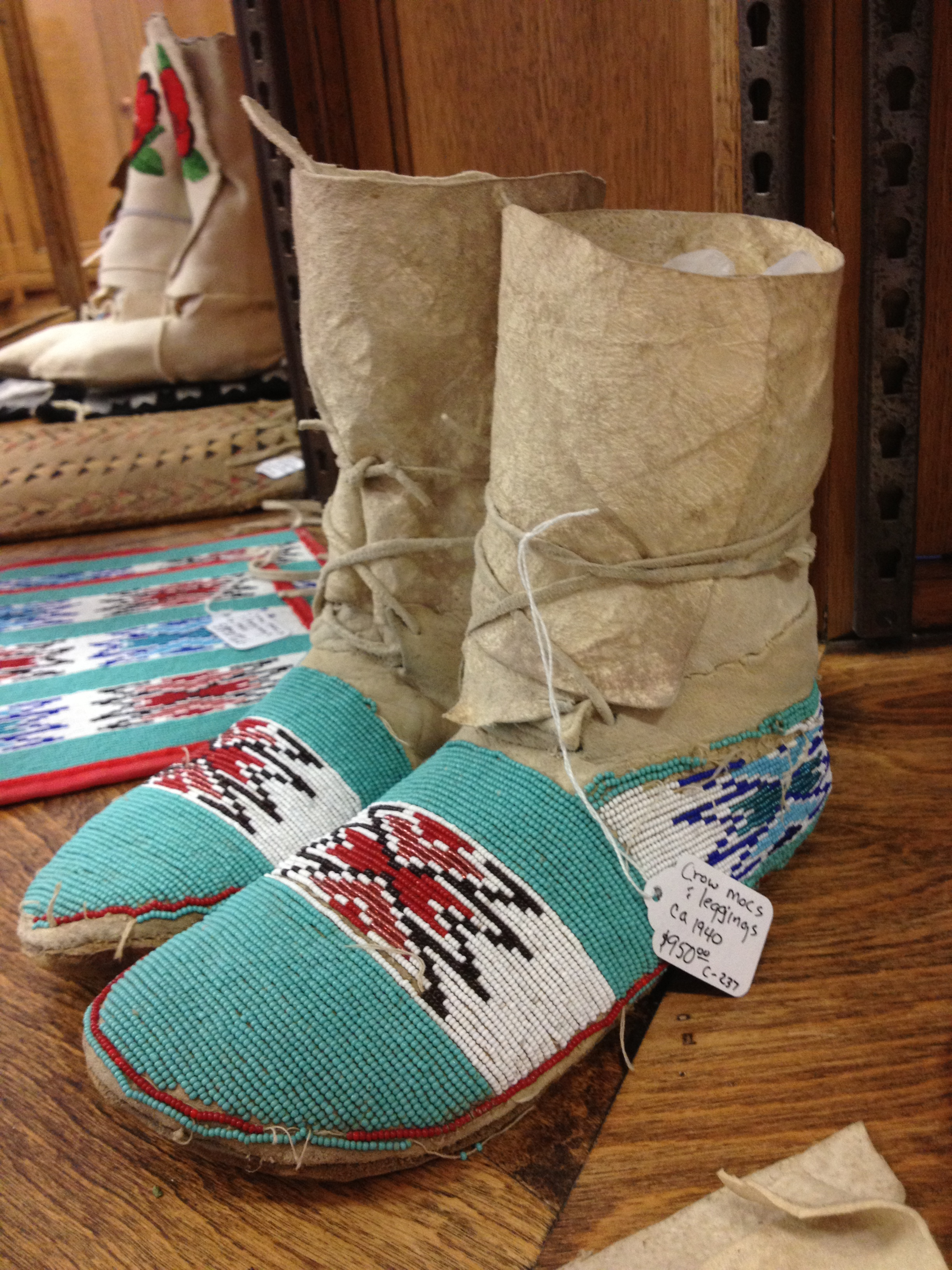
Crow moccasins, c. 1940

=== Gender and kinship system ===
The Crow traditionally had a matrilineal kinship system. After marriage, the couple was matrilocal (the husband moved to the wife's mother's house upon marriage). Women hold a significant role within the tribe.

The Crow possess ten clans (ashammalíaxxiia), linked to the Crow lunar calendar:

- Ashbatshúa (Treacherous Lodge Clan) or Ashkaámne (Blood Indian Lodge Clan or Piegan Clan)
- Ashhilaalío (Newly-Made Lodge Clan)
- Ashiíooshe (Sore Lip Clan)
- Ashképkawiia (Bad War Deeds Clan) or Ashxáhche (Streaked Lodge Clan or Hair Remaining Clan)
- Ashpeennuushé (Dung/Filth Eaters Clan)
- Ashshitchíte (Big Lodge Clan)
- Bilikóoshe (Whistling Waters Clan)
- Uússaawaachiia (Brings Home Game Without Shooting Clan)
- Úuwuutasshe or Áxxaashe Akbáaliio (Greasy Mouths Clan)
- Xúhkaalaxche (Ties in a Bundle Clan)

Crow kinship is a system used to describe and define family members. Identified by Lewis Henry Morgan in his 1871 work Systems of Consanguinity and Affinity of the Human Family, the Crow system is one of the six major types which he described: Eskimo, Hawaiian, Iroquois, Crow, Omaha, and Sudanese.

The Crow historically had a status for male-bodied two-spirits, termed baté/badé, such as Osh-Tisch.

== Crow Tribe of Montana ==
=== Geography ===
The Crow Indian Reservation in south-central Montana is a large reservation covering approximately 2,300,000 acres (3,600 sq mi; 9,300 km^{2}) of land area, the fifth-largest Indian reservation in the United States. The reservation is primarily in Big Horn and Yellowstone counties with ceded lands in Rosebud, Carbon, and Treasure counties. The Crow Indian Reservation's eastern border is the 107th meridian line, except along the border line of the Northern Cheyenne Indian Reservation.

The southern border is from the 107th meridian line west to the east bank of the Big Horn River. The line travels downstream to Bighorn Canyon National Recreation Area and west to the Pryor Mountains and north-easterly to Billings. The northern border travels east and through Hardin, Montana, to the 107th meridian line. The 2000 census reported a total population of 6,894 on reservation lands. Its largest community is Crow Agency.

Map of the Crow Reservation and nearby reservations (In Orange).

=== Government ===
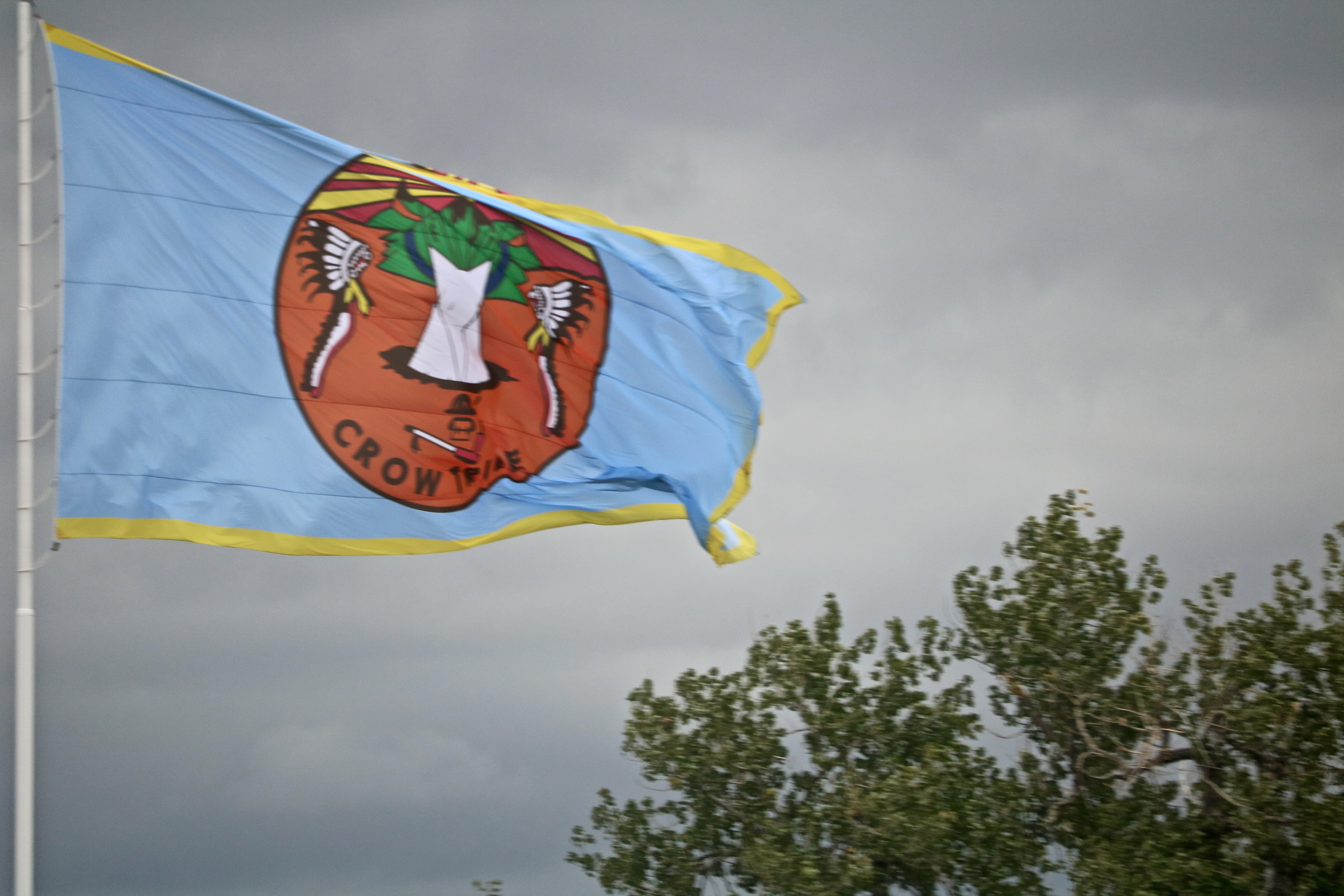
Crow flag seen from Interstate 90 at the Crow Indian Reservation, Big Horn County, Montana

Prior to the 2001 Constitution, the Crow Tribe of Montana was governed by its 1948 constitution. The former constitution organized the tribe as a general council (tribal council). The general council held the executive, legislative, and judicial powers of the government and included all enrolled, adult members of the Crow Tribe, provided that women were 18 years or older and men were 21 or older. The general council was a direct democracy, comparable to that of the Haudenosaunee Confederacy.

The Crow Tribe of Montana established a three-branch government at a 2001 council meeting with its 2001 constitution. The general council remains the governing body of the tribe; however, the powers were distributed to three separate branches within the government. In theory, the general council is still the governing body of the Crow Tribe, yet in reality the general council has not convened since the establishment of the 2001 constitution.

The executive branch has four officials. These officials are known as the chairperson, Vice-chairperson, Secretary, and Vice-Secretary. The Executive Branch officials are also the officials within the Crow Tribal General Council, which has not met since 15 July 2001.

The current administration of the Crow Tribe Executive Branch is as follows:

- Chairman: Frank White Clay
- Vice-chairman: Lawrence DeCrane
- Secretary: Levi Black Eagle
- Vice-Secretary: Channis Whiteman

The Legislative Branch consists of three members from each district on the Crow Indian Reservation. The Crow Indian Reservation is divided into six districts known as The Valley of the Chiefs, Reno, Black Lodge, Mighty Few, Big Horn, and Pryor Districts. The Valley of the Chiefs District is the largest district by population.

The Judicial Branch consists of all courts established by the Crow Law and Order Code and in accordance with the 2001 Constitution. The Judicial Branch has jurisdiction over all matters defined in the Crow Law and Order Code. The Judicial Branch attempts to be a separate and distinct branch of government from the Legislative and Executive Branches of Crow Tribal Government. The Judicial Branch consists of an elected Chief Judge and two Associate Judges. The Crow Court of Appeals, similar to State Court of Appeals, receives all appeals from the lower courts. The Chief Judge of the Crow Tribe is Julie Yarlott.

==== Constitution controversy ====
According to the 1948 Constitution, Resolution 63-01 (Please note: in a letter of communication from Phileo Nash, then Commissioner of Indian Affairs, to the B.I.A. Area Director, as stated in the letter and confirmed that 63-01 is an Ordinance in said letter) all constitutional amendments must be voted on by secret ballot or referendum vote. In 2001, major actions were taken by the former Chairperson Birdinground without complying with those requirements. The quarterly council meeting on 15 July 2001 passed all resolutions by voice vote, including the measure to repeal the current constitution and approve a new constitution.

Critics contend the new constitution is contrary to the spirit of the Crow Tribe, as it provides authority for the US Bureau of Indian Affairs (BIA) to approve Crow legislation and decisions. The Crow people have guarded their sovereignty and Treaty Rights. The alleged New Constitution was not voted on to add it to the agenda of the Tribal Council. The former constitution mandated that constitutional changes be conducted by referendum vote, using the secret ballot election method and criteria. In addition, a constitutional change can only be conducted in a specially called election, which was never approved by council action for the 2001 Constitution. The agenda was not voted on or accepted at the council.

The only vote taken at the council was whether to conduct the voting by voice vote or walking through the line. Critics say the chairman ignored and suppressed attempts to discuss the Constitution. This council and constitutional change was never ratified by any subsequent council action. The Tribal Secretary, who was removed from office by the Birdinground Administration, was the leader of the opposition. All activity occurred without his signature.

When the opposition challenged, citing the violation of the Constitutional Process and the Right to Vote, the Birdinground Administration sought the approval of the United States Department of the Interior (USDOI), Bureau of Indian Affairs (BIA). The latter stated it could not interfere in an internal tribal affair The federal court also ruled that the constitutional change was an internal tribal matter.

=== Leadership ===
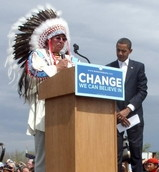
Crow Tribal Chairperson Carl Venne and Barack Obama on the Crow Indian Reservation in Montana on 19 May 2008. Obama was the first presidential candidate to visit the Crow Tribe.

The seat of government and capital of the Crow Indian Reservation is Crow Agency, Montana.

The Crow Tribe historically elected a chairperson of tribal council biennially; however, in 2001, the term of office was extended to four years. The previous chairperson was Carl Venne. The chairperson serves as chief executive officer, speaker of the council, and majority leader of the Crow Tribal Council. The constitutional changes of 2001 created a three-branch government. The chairperson serves as the head of the executive branch, which includes the offices of vice-chairperson, secretary, vice-secretary, and the tribal offices and departments of the Crow Tribal Administration. Notable chairs include Clara Nomee, Edison Real Bird, and Robert "Robie" Yellowtail.

On 19 May 2008, Hartford and Mary Black Eagle of the Crow Tribe adopted U.S. Senator (later President) Barack Obama into the tribe on the date of the first visit of a U.S. presidential candidate to the nation. Crow representatives also took part in President Obama's inaugural parade. In 2009, Dr. Joseph Medicine Crow was one of 16 people awarded the Presidential Medal of Freedom.

During the United States federal government shutdown of 2013, the Crow Tribe furloughed 316 employees and suspended programs providing health care, bus services and improvements to irrigation.

In 2020, the Tribal Chairman AJ Not Afraid Jr. endorsed President Donald Trump's reelection, along with endorsing Republicans Steve Daines for the Senate, Greg Gianforte for Governor and Matt Rosendale for the U.S. House.

== Notable Crow people ==
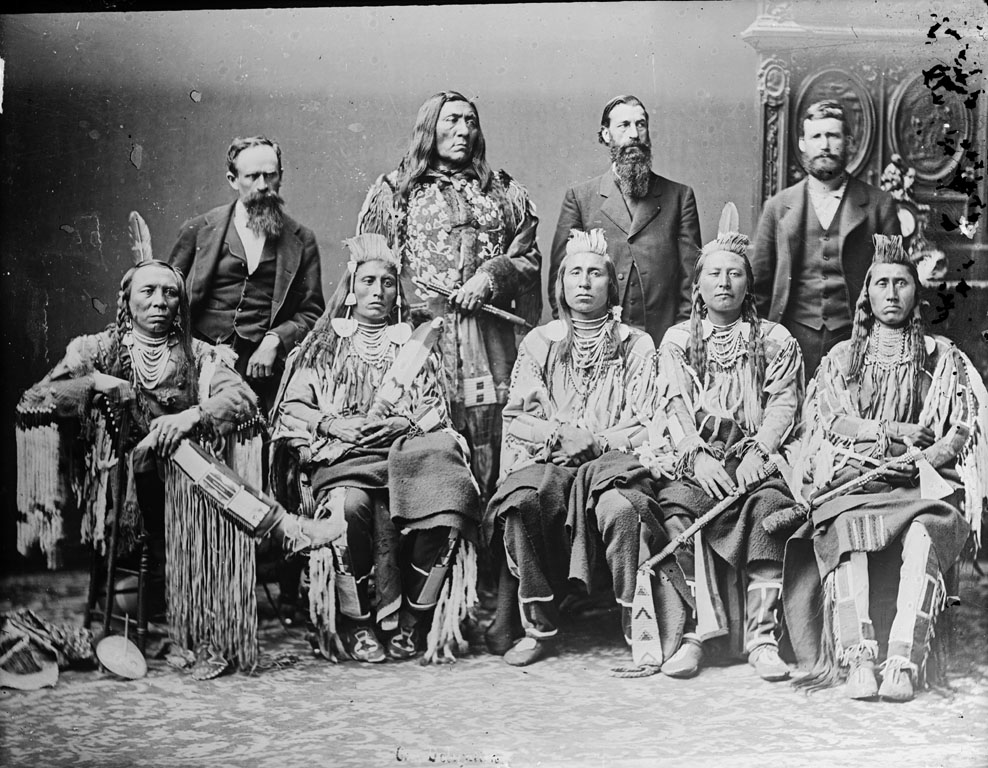
Delegation of important Crow chiefs, 1880. From left to right: Old Crow, Medicine Crow, Long Elk, Plenty Coups, and Pretty Eagle.

- Eldena Bear Don't Walk (Crow/Salish/Kutenai, b. c. 1973), lawyer, judge, politician, first woman to serve as the Chief Justice of the Crow Tribe
- Max Big Man, educator, artist, and honorary chief who created educational programming with CBS Radio
- Earl Biss (1947–1998), painter
- Bull Chief (c. 1825 – unknown), war chief (pipe carrier), who fought against Lakota, Nez Percé, Shoshone, and Piegan Blackfoot warriors, he also resisted white settlement of Crow territory
- Curly (or Curley) (also known as Ashishishe/Shishi'esh, c. 1856 – 1923), Indian Scout and warrior
- Goes Ahead or Ba'suck'osh (also Walks Among the Stars, 1851–1919), Indian Scout and warrior, husband of Pretty Shield
- Hairy Moccasin or Esh-sup-pee-me-shish (c. 1854 – 1922), Crow Indian Scout and warrior
- Half Yellow Face or Ischu Shi Dish (c. 1830 – c. 1879), Crow Indian Scout and warrior, war leader (pipe carrier) and leader of the six Crow Scouts who assisted General George A. Custer
- Issaatxalúash, also Two Leggings (mid-1840s – 1923); bacheeítche (local group leader) of River Crow, war leader (pipe carrier), during the first years of the reservation era
- Donald Laverdure, Principal Deputy Assistant Secretary of Indian Affairs at the U.S. Department of the Interior
- Joe Medicine Crow, also PédhitšhÎ-wahpášh (1913–2016), the last war chief (pipe carrier) of the Crow Tribe, educator, historian, author, and official anthropologist
- Elias Not Afraid; (born 1990), artist known for his traditional and non-traditional beadwork
- Janine Pease, an American Indian educator and advocate and the first woman of Crow lineage to earn a doctorate degree
- Wendy Red Star, visual artist
- Plenty Coups, Crow chief who cooperated with the government against other more hostile tribes, ensuring the Crow kept much of their traditional lands.
- Pretty Eagle, fellow war chief of Plenty Coups, who worked with him to ensure the tribe's cooperation with the federal government.
- Pretty Shield (c. 1856 – 1944), medicine woman, wife of Goes Ahead, a scout at the Battle of the Little Bighorn
- Shows as He Goes, war chief
- Pauline Small or Strikes Twice In One Summer (1924–2005), first woman to serve in Crow Tribal Council
- Frank Shively (c. 1877 – unknown), football coach
- Supaman, also Christian Parrish Takes the Gun, rapper and fancy dancer
- Noah Watts, also Bulaagawish (Old Bull), actor and musician, best known for his role as Ratonhnhaké:ton, the main character of Assassin's Creed III
- Bethany Yellowtail (Crow/Northern Cheyenne), fashion designer based in Los Angeles
- Robert Yellowtail (1889–1988), leader of Crow Tribe, first Native American to hold position of Agency Superintendent
- Thomas Yellowtail (1903–1993), a medicine man and Sun Dance Chief of the Crow Tribe
- White Man Runs Him (c. 1858 – 1929); Crow Indian Scout and warrior, step-grandfather of Joe Medicine Crow
- White Swan, also Mee-nah-tsee-us (White Goose, c. 1850 – 1904), Indian Scout and warrior, cousin of Curly.

== See also ==
- Absaroka, a proposed state located in parts of Montana, South Dakota, and Wyoming.
- Crow religion
- James Beckwourth, a Black chief of the Crow tribe
- Pine Leaf, a female chief of the Crow tribe

== General and cited references ==
- Keith Algier, The Crow and the Eagle: A Tribal History from Lewis & Clark to Custer, Caxton Printers, Caldwell, Idaho, 1993, paperback, ISBN 0-87004-357-9
- Charles Bradley, The Handsome People: A History of the Crow Indians and the Whites, Council for Indian Education, 1991, paperback, ISBN 0-89992-130-2
- Michael Oren Fitzgerald, Yellowtail, Crow Medicine Man and Sun Dance Chief: An Autobiography, University of Oklahoma Press, Norman, Oklahoma, 1991, hardcover, ISBN 0-8061-2602-7
- Rodney Frey, The World of the Crow Indians: As Driftwood Lodges, Norman: University of Oklahoma Press, 1987. ISBN 0-8061-2076-2
- Rodney Frey (ed.), Stories That Make the World: Oral Literature of the Indian Peoples of the Inland Northwest. As Told by Lawrence Aripa, Tom Yellowtail and Other Elders. Norman: University of Oklahoma Press, 1995. ISBN 0-8061-3131-4
- Frederick E. Hoxie, Parading through History: The Making of the Crow Nation in America 1805–1935, Cambridge University Press, Cambridge, United Kingdom, 1995, hardcover, ISBN 0-521-48057-4
- Jonathan Lear, Radical Hope: Ethics in the Face of Cultural Devastation, Harvard University Press, 2006, ISBN 0-674-02329-3
- Thomas H. Leforge, Memoirs of a White Crow Indian, The Century Co., 1928, hardcover, ASIN B00086PAP6
- Frank B. Linderman, Plenty-Coups: Chief of the Crows, University of Nebraska Press, Lincoln, Nebraska, 1962, paperback, ISBN 0-8032-5121-1
- Frank B. Linderman, Pretty-shield: Medicine Woman of the Crows, University of Nebraska Press, Lincoln, Nebraska, 1974, paperback, ISBN 0-8032-8025-4
- Robert H. Lowie, Social Life of the Crow Indians, AMS Press, 1912, hardcover, ISBN 0-404-11875-5
- Robert H. Lowie, 1914, The Crow Sun Dance, hardcover, ASIN B0008CBIOW
- Robert H. Lowie, The Tobacco Society of the Crow Indians, The Trustees, 1919, hardcover, ASIN B00086IFRG
- Robert H. Lowie, Crow Indian Art, The Trustees, 1922, ASIN B00086D6RK
- Robert H. Lowie, Material Culture of the Crow Indians, The Trustees, 1922, hardcover, ASIN B00085WH80
- Robert H. Lowie, Religion of the Crow Indians, The Trustees, 1922, hardcover, ASIN B00086IFQM
- Robert H. Lowie, Minor Ceremonies of the Crow Indians, American Museum Press, 1924, hardcover, ASIN B00086D3NC
- Robert H. Lowie, The Crow Language, University of California Press, 1941, hardcover, ASIN B0007EKBDU
- Robert H. Lowie, Myths and Traditions of the Crow Indians, AMS Press, 1980, hardcover, ISBN 0-404-11872-0
- Robert H. Lowie, The Crow Indians, University of Nebraska Press, Lincoln, Nebraska, 1983, paperback, ISBN 0-8032-7909-4
- Joseph Medicine Crow, From the Heart of the Crow Country: The Crow Indians' Own Stories, University of Nebraska Press, Lincoln, Nebraska, 2000, paperback, ISBN 0-8032-8263-X
- Peter Nabokov, Two Leggings: The Making of a Crow Warrior, Crowell Publishing Co., 1967, hardcover, ASIN B0007EN16O
- Henry Old Coyote and Barney Old Coyote, The Way of the Warrior: Stories of the Crow People, University of Nebraska Press, Lincoln, Nebraska, 2003, ISBN 0-8032-3572-0
- Helene Smith and Lloyd G. Mickey Old Coyote, Apsaalooka: The Crow Nation Then and Now, MacDonald/Swãrd Publishing Company, Greensburg, Pennsylvania, 1992, paperback, ISBN 0-945437-11-0
- Alma Hogan Snell, Grandmother's Grandchild: My Crow Indian Life, University of Nebraska Press, Lincoln, Nebraska, 2000, hardcover, ISBN 0-8032-4277-8
- Fred W. Voget and Mary K. Mee, They Call Me Agnes: A Crow Narrative Based on the Life of Agnes Yellowtail Deernose, University of Oklahoma Press, Norman, Oklahoma, 1995, hardcover, ISBN 0-8061-2695-7
