= Pretty Eagle =

Crow Nation war chief

- Déaxitchish
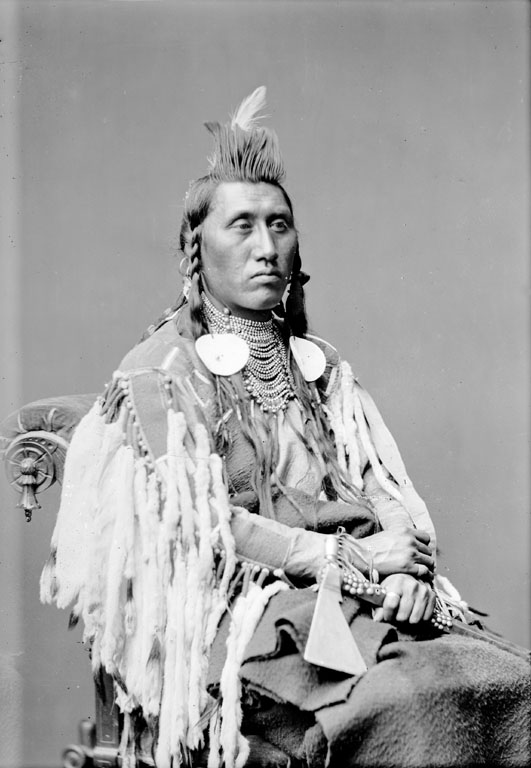
- Chief Pretty Eagle, 1880.
- Born: c. 1846; Near Crow Agency, Montana
- Died: 11 November 1903
- Resting place: Pretty Eagle Point, Bighorn Canyon
- Known for: A chief of the Crow Indian Nation

Chief Pretty Eagle (Crow: Déaxitchish; c. 1846–1903) was a war chief, warrior, and diplomat of the Crow Nation. He was born in about 1846 near present-day Crow Agency in Montana to the Mountain Crow division of the Crow Indians, one of three major divisions that made up the nation. During and after his lifetime he was known for his prowess as a war chief and his devotion to his people, often traveling to Washington, D.C., with Crow delegations to discuss and fight for Crow rights, including land rights. During his life he had 19 wives, many of which were likely temporary marriages which did not last long.

== War chief ==
Pretty Eagle was already a chief of the Crows when the United States Army first started making organized ventures into what is present day Montana and Wyoming, this included the traditional territory of the Crow people which spanned the border of the two states. Pretty Eagle was a member of the Fox Society of warriors (Iáxuhke) and the Piegan (Ashkaámne) clan of Crows. The Piegan clan took its name from the Piegan Indian nation, part of the Blackfoot Confederacy and longtime enemies of the Crow Nation. As a warrior Pretty Eagle was well known for and revered for his many war deeds performed against traditional Crow enemies such as Sioux and Pawnee. Pretty Eagle accumulated enough specific war deeds or coups to be considered a war chief by his people.

== Relationship with United States Government ==
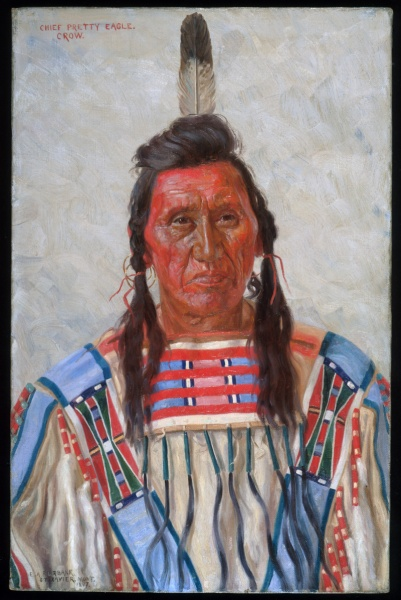
Painting of chief Pretty Eagle by E.A Burbank, 1897

Pretty Eagle, like many other Crow warriors, offered his services as an Indian scout for the United States Army. Pretty Eagle, along with famous chief Plenty Coups, agreed that it was best to work with the invading U.S. government rather than fight against their encroachment. The newly formed alliance between traditional Crow enemies the Sioux, Cheyenne, and Arapaho nations factored heavily into the Crow's decisions to help the U.S. government. The Crow found themselves sandwiched between enemies on all sides and felt the U.S. Army could offer them protection and would therefore also be one less enemy for them to defend themselves against. Pretty Eagle often accompanied other important Crow chiefs on their delegations to Washington, D.C., to discuss issues regarding Crow rights. In 1880 he accompanied the Crow delegation which met with President Rutherford B. Hayes to speak out against the sale of Crow reservation lands and the construction of the Chicago, Burlington, and Quincy Railroads, which had routes passing through the Crow Reservation. Pretty Eagle supported the grazing of cattle and growing of hay on Crow lands to sell to white farmers as a means of income and dependence after the bison herds disappeared. Due to their cooperation, the tribe managed to keep a large reservation on part of their ancestral land. Prominent sculptor Cyrus Dallin accompanied him on a train ride East and would later sculpt him from memory in 1910.

== Death and Burial ==
Pretty Eagle died on 11 November 1903. His remains were placed in a wagon box instead of the more common and traditional scaffolds. During the early 1900s his remains, along with sixty other Crows, were exhumed from their resting place along the Bighorn River by Dr. W. A Russell and sold to various museums around the U.S. with some selling for as little as $500.

== Reburial and reclamation ==
The remains of Pretty Eagle were returned to the Crow Nation 72 years after they were exhumed, thanks to the efforts of Hugh White Clay and the Crow Cultural Commission. His remains were reburied on 4 June 1994, at Pretty Eagle point, a place named in his honor, overlooking the Bighorn Canyon. Horse-drawn travois made of lodge poles and bison hide were used to cart his remains to his present resting place. The date of the reburial has become a date of celebration for the Crow people, and offerings are often placed at the grave site.
