= Plains Indian warfare =

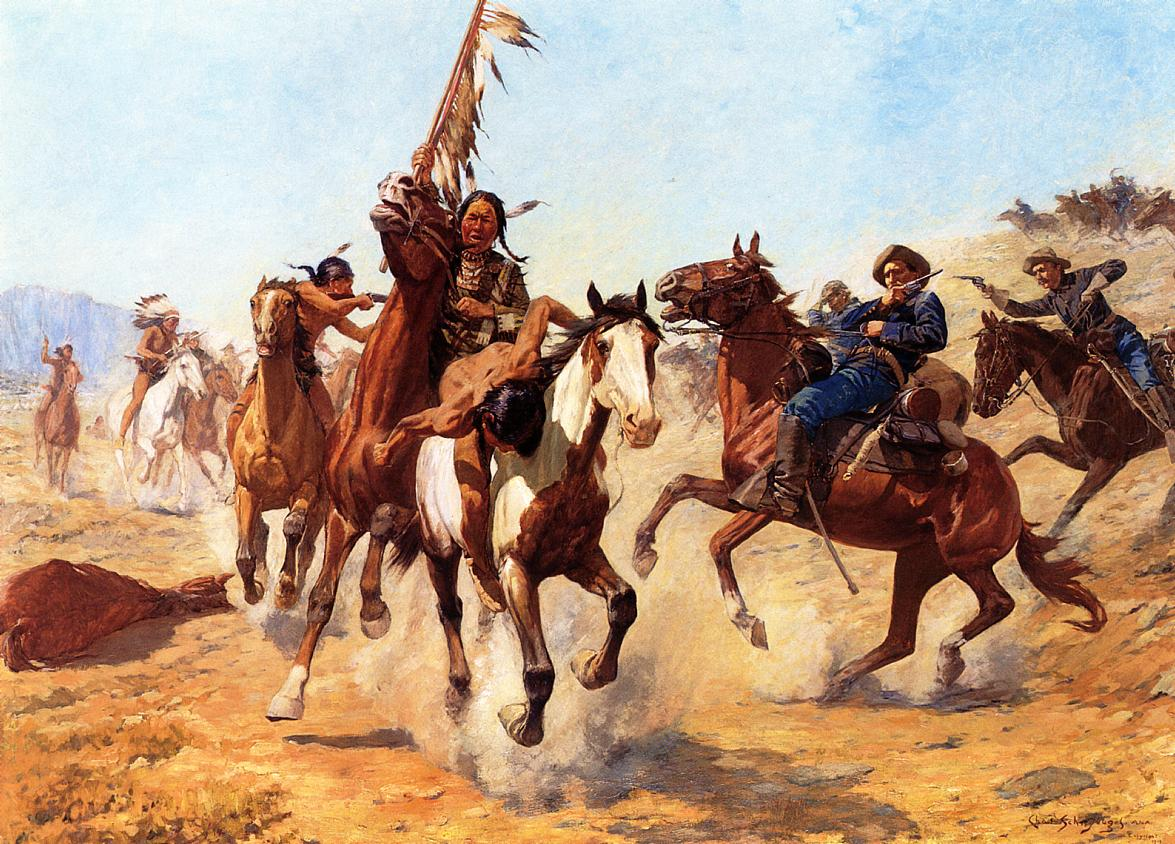
This painting depicts the speed and violence of an encounter between the U.S. cavalry and Plains Indians.

During the American Indian Wars of the mid to late 19th century, Native American warriors of the Great Plains, sometimes referred to as braves in contemporary colonial sources, resisted westward expansion onto their ancestral land by settlers from the United States. Though a diverse range of peoples inhabited the Great Plains, there were a number of commonalities among their warfare practices.

== History ==
The earliest Spanish explorers in the 16th century did not find the Plains Native Americans especially warlike. The Wichita in Kansas and Oklahoma lived in dispersed settlements with no defensive works. The Spanish initially had friendly contacts with the Apache (Querechos) in the Texas Panhandle.

Three factors led to a growing importance of warfare in Plains Indian culture. First, was the Spanish colonization of New Mexico which stimulated raids and counter-raids by Spaniards and Indians for goods and slaves. Second, was the contact of the Indians with French fur traders which increased rivalry among Native tribes to control trade and trade routes. Third, was the acquisition of the horse and the greater mobility it afforded the Plains Indians. What evolved among the Plains Native Americans from the 17th to the late 19th century was warfare as both a means of livelihood and a sport. Young men gained both prestige and plunder by fighting as warriors, and this individualistic style of warfare ensured that success in individual combat and capturing trophies of war were highly esteemed

== Tactics ==
The Plains Native Americans raided each other, the Spanish colonies, and, increasingly, the encroaching frontier of the Anglos for horses and other property. They acquired guns and other European goods primarily by trade. Their principal trading products were buffalo hides and beaver pelts. The most famous victory ever won by Plains Indians over the United States, the Battle of Little Bighorn, in 1876, was won by the Lakota (Sioux) and Cheyenne fighting on the defensive.

Although they could be tenacious in defense, Plains Native American warriors took the offensive mostly for material gain and individual prestige. The highest military honors were for "counting coup"—touching a live enemy. Battles between Indians often consisted of opposing warriors demonstrating their bravery rather than attempting to achieve concrete military objectives. The emphasis was on ambush and hit-and-run actions rather than closing with an enemy. Success was often counted by the number of horses or property obtained in the raid. Casualties were usually light. "Indians consider it foolhardiness to make an attack where it is certain some of them will be killed." Given their smaller numbers, the loss of even a few men in battle could be catastrophic for a band, and notably at the battles of Adobe Walls in Texas in 1874 and Rosebud in Montana in 1876, the Indians broke off battle despite the fact that they were winning as the casualties were not considered worth a victory. Decisions whether to fight or not were based on a cost-benefit ratio; even the loss of one warrior was not considered to be worth taking a few scalps, but if a herd of horses could be obtained, the loss of a warrior or two was considered acceptable. Generally speaking, given the small sizes of the bands and the vast population of the United States, the Plains Indians sought to avoid casualties in battle and would avoid fighting if it meant losses.

== Logistics ==
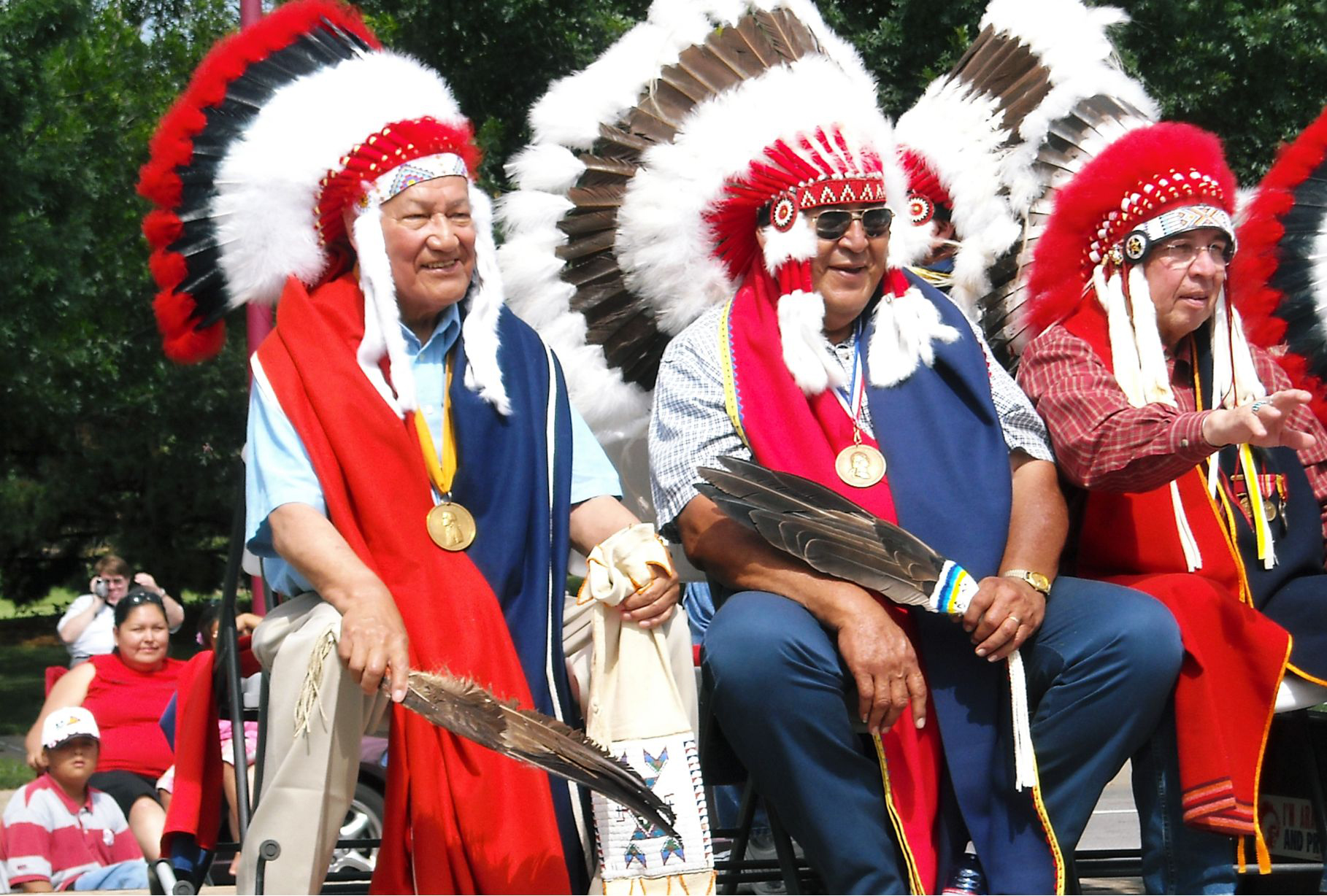
Southern Cheyenne Chiefs Lawrence Hart, Darryl Flyingman and Harvey Pratt in Oklahoma City, 2008

Due to their mobility, endurance, horsemanship, and knowledge of the vast plains that were their domain, the Plains Native Americans were often victors in their battles against the U.S. army in the era of American Westward expansion from 1803 to about 1890. However, although Indians won many battles, they could not undertake lengthy campaigns. Native American armies could only be assembled for brief periods of time as warriors also had to hunt for food for their families. The exception to that was raids into Mexico by the Comanche and their allies in which the raiders often subsisted for months off the riches of Mexican haciendas and settlements.

== Horsemanship ==
Native Americans of the Great Plains learned to ride from a young age, on small cayuse horses originally introduced by the Spanish conquistadors. These were usually ridden bareback, with only a blanket for comfort. At long range, a warrior would cling to the side of his horse and use it as a shield, while returning fire with his own gun or bow and arrow. The most renowned of all the Plains Indians as warriors were the Comanche whom The Economist noted in 2010: "They could loose a flock of arrows while hanging off the side of a galloping horse, using the animal as protection against return fire. The sight amazed and terrified their white (and Indian) adversaries." The American historian S. C. Gwynne called the Comanche "the greatest light cavalry on the earth" in the 19th century whose raids in Texas terrified the American settlers.

== Insignia ==
To qualify as a warrior, and thus earn the right to wear an eagle feather, Native American youths in some tribes were required to perform an act of courage on behalf of their tribe. For Indigenous peoples of the Great Plains such as the Crow people, Cheyenne people, Lakota people or Apache this included killing and scalping an enemy, capturing a horse, disarming an opponent, infiltrating the enemy's camp, taking a prisoner, or striking an opponent in battle without killing him. The awarding of an eagle feather, the traditional insignia of a Native American warrior, was an important rite of passage into manhood, after which the warrior assumed a new name. Few Native Americans received more than three eagle feathers during their lifetime due to the bird's rarity and sacred status, but exceptionally courageous and talented warriors such as Sitting Bull, Geronimo or Cochise could ultimately earn enough feathers to make a war bonnet.

Indigenous peoples of the Great Plains frequently decorated their buckskin war shirts with the scalps of their enemies, bone breastplates as protection from cold weapons, bear claws, porcupine quills or wolf teeth to demonstrate their hunting prowess, silver conchos made from Morgan Dollars or Mexican pesos, and elaborate glass beadwork. This attire served the dual purpose of terrifying their enemies, and ensuring the warrior looked his best before the Great Spirit if he was killed in battle. Common bead patterns, believed to protect the wearer in battle, included the thunderbird, diamonds and crosses, or zigzags in white, cyan, black, red, orange and yellow.

Among tribes such as the Pawnee, Iroquois and Mohawk, warriors received a Mohican as part of their initiation into manhood. In these cultures, a brave was not allowed to shave his head until he had seen battle. Tattooing and scarification were also in use among Southeastern tribes such as the Cherokee, Seminole and Creek to enable a warrior to demonstrate his resistance to pain, signify allegiance to a specific tribe or marital status, and to draw favours from totem spirit animals such as Raven, the Great Bear, or the serpent. Centuries before the arrival of the first pioneers, the shaman would tattoo braves using cactus spines dipped in a carbon-based ink.

== Weaponry ==
=== Close-range weapons ===
At close range, Native American warriors favoured edged weapons such as knives. Tomahawks were originally carved from stone, but by the 18th century forged iron axes could be acquired through trade. Some had decorative star or heart-shaped cutouts, and the tomahawks of tribal chiefs sometimes featured a pipe bowl. Spears could be thrown, or used as lances. Other commonly used weapons included ball-topped clubs and gunstock war clubs decorated with brass thumbtacks taken from old trunks burned as firewood by American pioneers. Heroic deeds were recorded by carving notches into the club, or less commonly, by attaching an eagle feather.

=== Long-range weapons ===
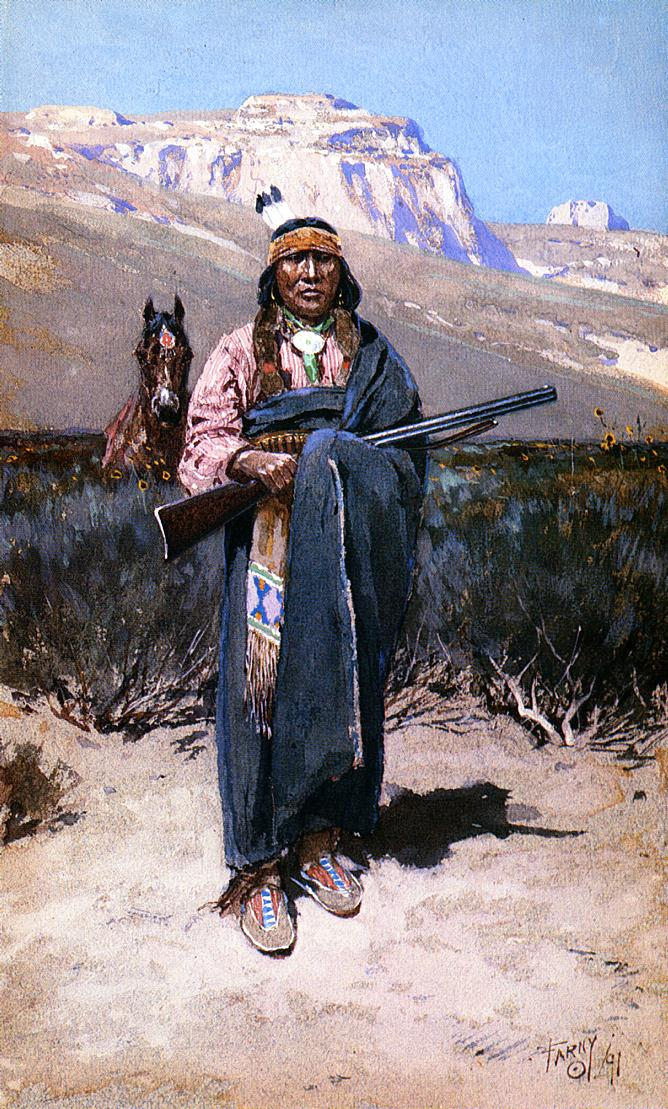
Painting of a Native American warrior with three eagle feathers.

The basic weapon of the Indian warrior was the short, stout bow, designed for use on horseback and deadly, but only at short range. Guns were usually in short supply and ammunition scarce for Native warriors. The shortages of ammunition together with the lack of training to handle firearms meant the preferred weapon was the bow and arrow. After the American Civil War, however, firearms were in widespread use. The U.S. government through the Indian Agency would sell the Plains Indians guns for hunting, but unlicensed traders would exchange guns for buffalo hides. The braves of the First Nations Wars made use of many different types of gun, including flintlock horse pistols, long rifles, Colt revolvers, Springfield muskets, Remington rolling blocks, Sharps carbines taken from the US cavalry, and repeating rifles such as the Winchester yellowboy or Spencer carbine.

== In American service ==
United States Army Indian Scouts and trackers had served the US government since the Civil War. During the Indian Wars, the Pawnee people, the Crow people and the Tonkawa people allied with the American cavalry against their old rivals the Apache and Sioux. Sgt. I-See-O of the Kiowa people was still in active service during the World War I era.

== Legacy ==
Many Native Americans joined the American armed forces during World War I and World War II. Joe Medicine Crow wore warpaint into battle and was awarded eagle feathers and the rank of chief by the elders of his tribe because each of the four heroic deeds he performed in Europe mirrored the traditional counting coup requirements.

The name Peace of the Braves has been used to refer to several peace agreements with First Nations in Canada.

== Sources ==
- Bury My Heart at Wounded Knee (1970) by Dee Brown
- Time-Life: The Old West (1971-80), by various authors

== See also ==
- Tracking (hunting)
- Loafers
