= Hugh L. Scott =

7th Chief of Staff of the United States Army (1914–17)

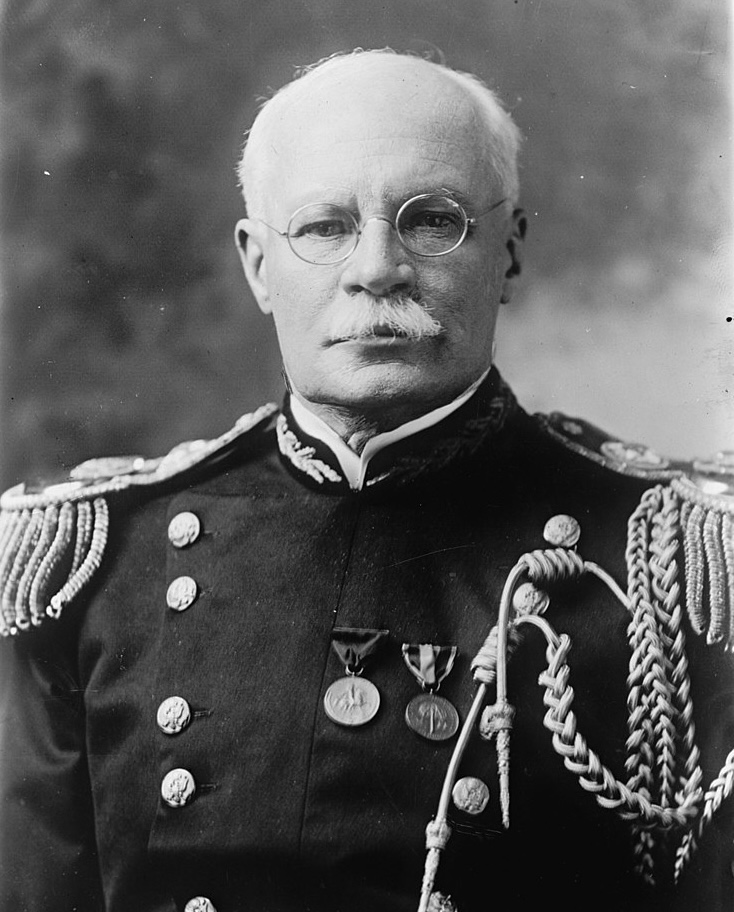
- General Scott, c. 1908–1919
- Born: Hugh Lenox Scott; September 22, 1853 near Danville, Kentucky, U.S.
- Died: April 30, 1934 (aged 80); Washington, D.C., U.S.
- Burial place: Arlington National Cemetery, Virginia, U.S.
- Military career
- Allegiance: United States
- Branch: United States Army
- Service years: 1876–1919
- Rank: Major general
- Nickname: Molay-tay-quop (He Talks With Hands) (Comanche)
- Unit: Cavalry Branch
- Commands: 78th Division; Chief of Staff of the United States Army; 2nd Cavalry Brigade; 3rd Cavalry Regiment; Superintendent of the United States Military Academy
- Conflicts: American Indian Wars: Nez Percé War; Ghost Dance War; Bluff War; Philippine–American War World War I Russian Civil War
- Awards: Army Distinguished Service Medal; Silver Star (2)

Hugh Lenox Scott (September 22, 1853 – April 30, 1934) was a United States Army officer. A West Point graduate of 1876, he served as superintendent of West Point from 1906 to 1910 and as chief of staff of the United States Army from 1914 to 1917, which included the first few months of American involvement in World War I. Following his military career Scott worked heavily with the Bureau of Indian Affairs and the Bureau of American Ethnology in salvage ethnography, particularly in the salvage of Plains Indian Sign Language.

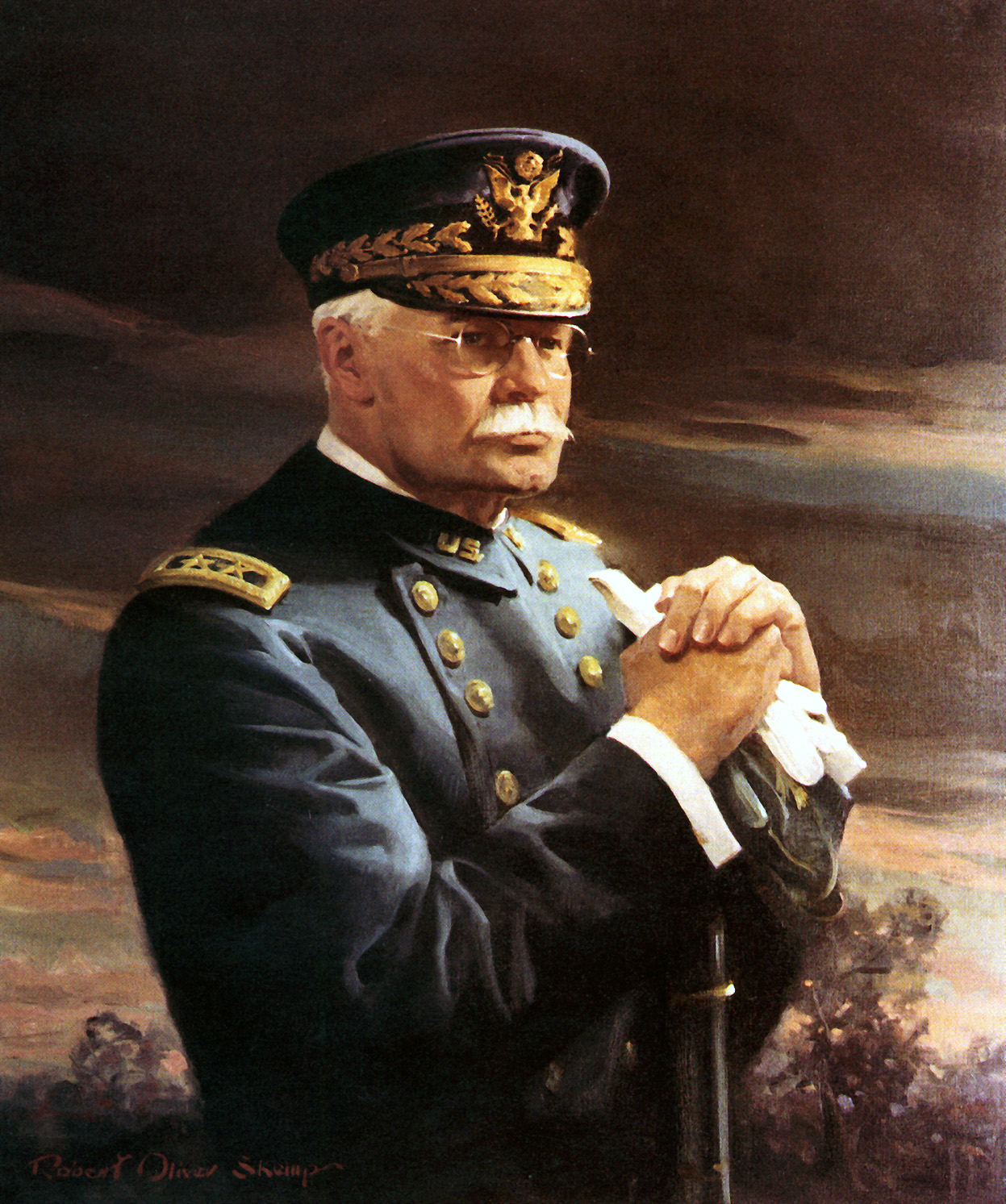
1973 Portrait by Robert Oliver Skemp

== Early life and family ==
Hugh L. Scott was born in Danville, Kentucky on September 22, 1853, the son of Reverend William McKendry Scott and Mary Elizabeth (Hodge) Scott. His father was a Presbyterian minister, while his mother was from a well educated family.He was the great-great-great-grandson of Benjamin Franklin. (Note: The family line ran from Scott to Elizabeth Hodge (mother) to Sarah Bache (grandmother) to Dr. William Bache (great-grandfather) to Sarah Franklin Bache (great-great grandmother) to Franklin (great-great-great grandfather.)) Scott's grandfather, Charles Hodge, was the longtime president of Princeton Theological Seminary. His great-uncle was David Hunter, a United States military officer.

Scott grew up in Danville and in Princeton, New Jersey, where he was educated at The Lawrenceville School. He attended Princeton University, before being accepted into the United States Military Academy at West Point. His great-uncle Hunter helped secure him a position at the academy in 1871.

== Military career ==
Scott graduated from West Point with the Class of 1876 (his Cullum number was 2628), and was commissioned in the cavalry. He was initially assigned to the 9th United States Cavalry, but three weeks after his graduation George Armstrong Custer and many of his 7th United States Cavalry Regiment were killed at the Battle of the Little Bighorn so he was reassigned to the 7th. He was sent to Fort Lincoln in the Dakota Territory and was briefly quartered in Custer's former home. While there he learned Sioux and sign language.

=== Indian Wars ===
In 1876, he was sent down the Missouri River with orders to disarm Sioux people allegedly arming Crazy Horse. In 1877, he was sent with 10 soldiers and 35 Cheyenne scouts to determine if the Sioux were forming war parties. Later that year he accompanied a supply train to Fort Custer and during his return he stopped to stay with members of the Crow tribe. After his stay, he found he preferred Crow horses. He was promoted to first lieutenant in June 1878.

In the fall of 1878, he was transferred to Fort Totten where met and married Mary Merrill, the daughter of General Lewis Merrill. They had a son, David Hunter Scott, while in the Dakota Territory. In 1886, he was transferred to Philadelphia to focus on recruitment, which he considered a career setback.

In August 1889 he was transferred to Fort Sill in the Indian Territory. He traveled by train to Henrietta, Texas, before taking a wagon to the fort. While Scott was apprehensive about future relations with the neighboring Kiowa, Comanche, and Apache, his knowledge of sign language impressed them. The Comanche would call him Molay-tay-quop, or He Talks With Hands. About this time, Scott met I-See-O of the Kiowa tribe who would become a chief intermediary between the various groups.

Scott was placed in command of Troop L of the 7th Cavalry on March 29, 1891, and of a detachment of Indian Scouts on September 18, 1891.

When Scott was given command of Troop L of the regiment in 1891, he had I-See-O serve as his first sergeant. (Infantry regiments designated Company I for their Native American scouts, and cavalry regiments did the same with Troop L.) During the ghost dance phenomenon of the early 1890s, I-See-O helped in persuading the Apache and Kiowa tribes not to go to war. This action, while serving the interest of white settlers and speculators, undoubtedly also saved the lives of many Native Americans. Scott's gratitude to I-See-O was such that, when he was chief of staff of the army, he allowed for Sergeant I-See-O to remain on active duty for life.

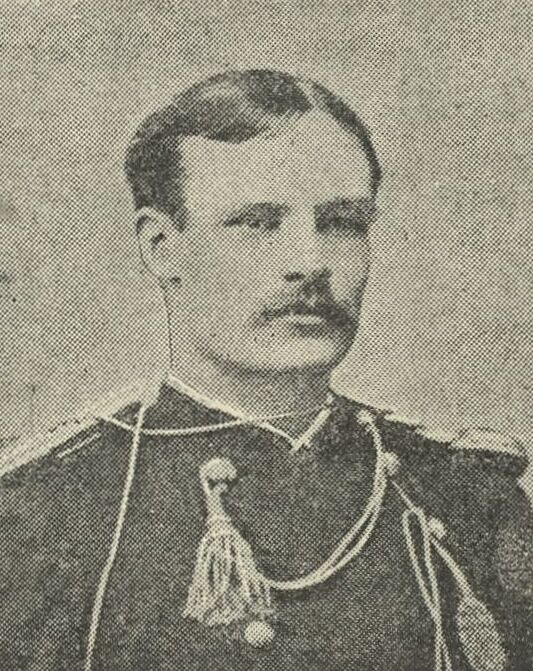
Portrait of Scott in 1892

In 1890–91, he was given the responsibility for suppressing the "Ghost Dance" religious movement that swept the Indian reservations and received official commendation for that work. In 1892, he organized Troop L of the 7th Cavalry, composed of Kiowa, Comanche and Apache Indians, and commanded it until it was mustered out, the last Indian unit in the United States Army, in 1897. In 1894–97, he had charge of Geronimo's band of Chiricahua Apache Indian prisoners at Fort Sill, Oklahoma. He was promoted to captain in January 1895, having served as a first lieutenant for 16 1/2 years. In November 1897, he was attached to the Bureau of American Ethnology of the Smithsonian Institution, where he began preparing a work on Indian sign languages.

=== Spanish American War ===
In May 1898, after the outbreak of the Spanish–American War, he was appointed major of volunteers and assistant adjutant general of the 2nd and 3rd Divisions, I Corps. In March 1899 went to Cuba as adjutant general of the Department of Havana, with the rank of lieutenant colonel of volunteers.

In May 1900, he became adjutant general of the Department of Cuba and remained in that post until May 1902. During that time, he served for a time as acting governor and took an active part in the transfer of government into Cuban hands. He was promoted to major in the Regular Army in February 1903 and served as military governor of the Sulu Archipelago, Philippines, in 1903–06 and also commanded troops there, taking part in various skirmishes, reorganized the civil government and institutions. During this assignment he received two Silver Star citations for gallantry in action.

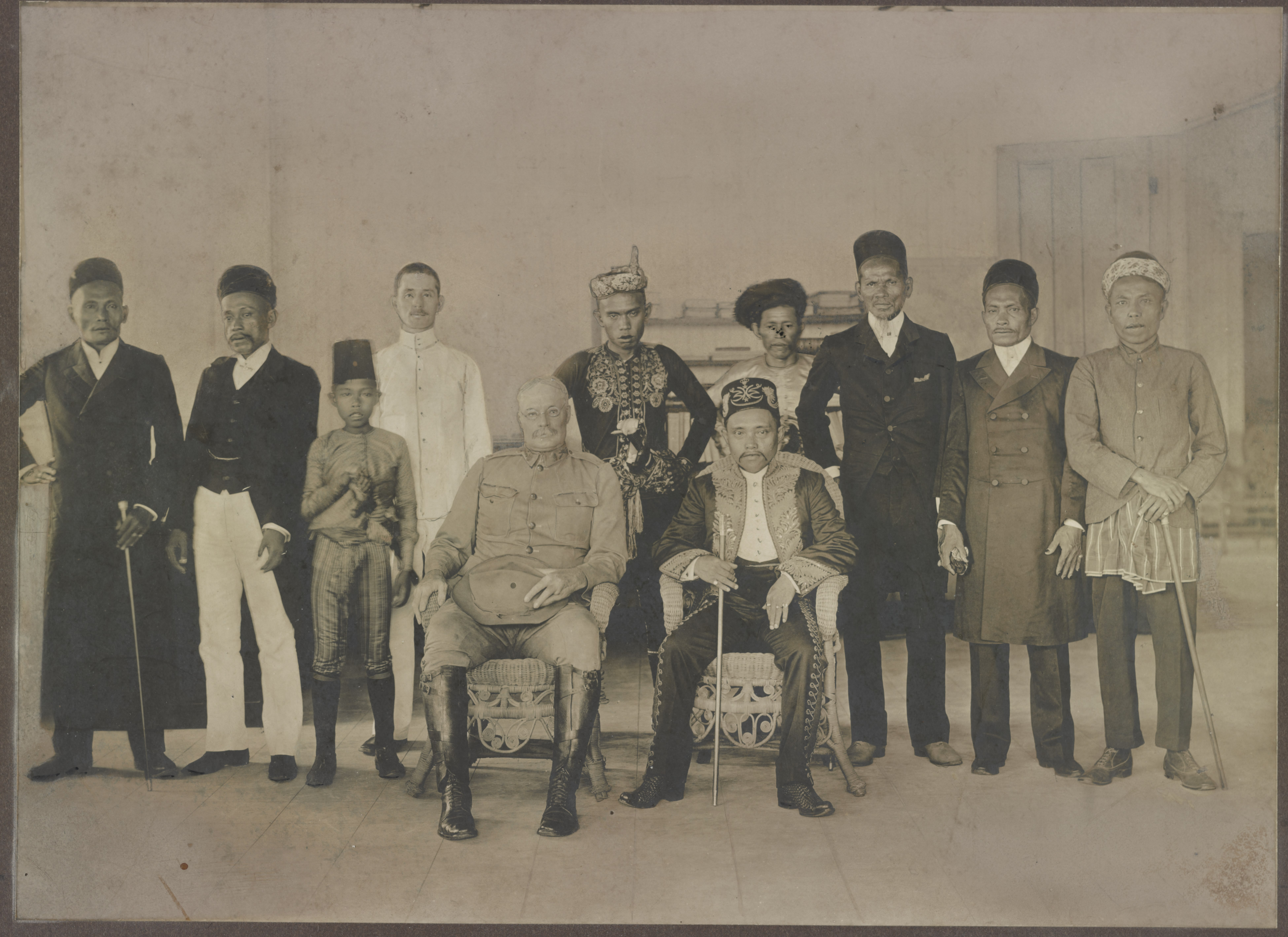
Military Governor Hugh Scott and Sultan Jamalul Kiram II of Sulu along with local government officials and hadjis (c. 1905)

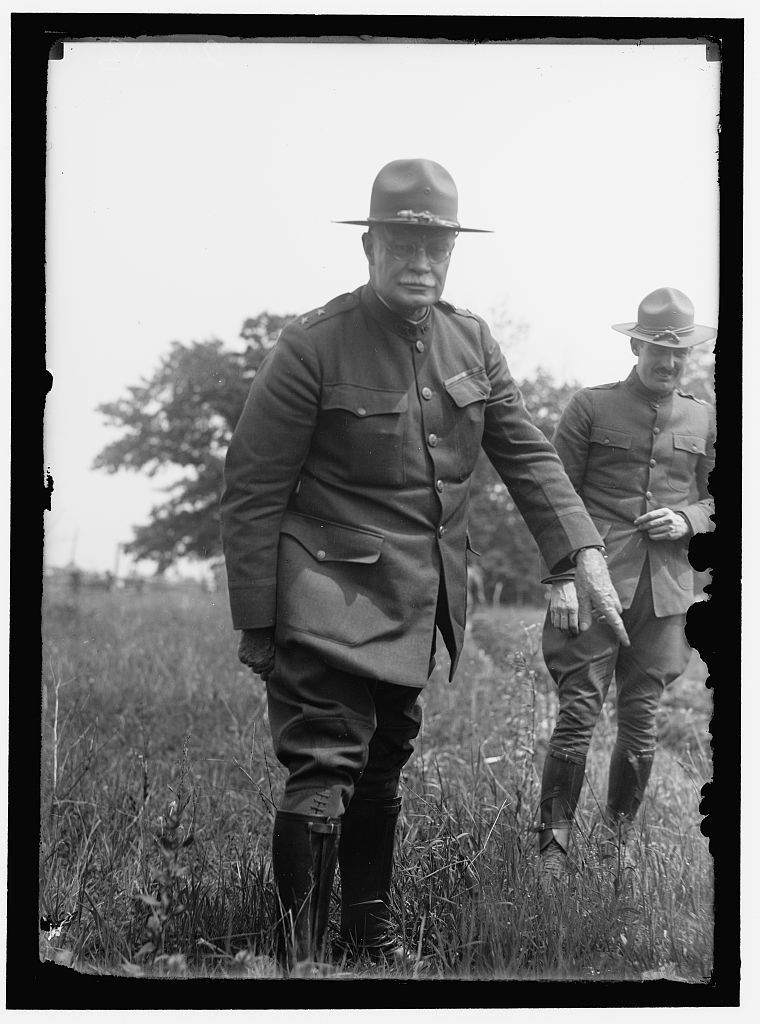
General Scott at Camp Dix.

=== Later Indian Wars ===
In August 1906, he was named superintendent of the United States Military Academy, a post he held for four years with the temporary rank of colonel. He was promoted to permanent lieutenant colonel in March 1911 and to colonel in August of the same year. He then commanded the 3rd United States Cavalry Regiment in Texas, engaged in settling various Indian troubles.

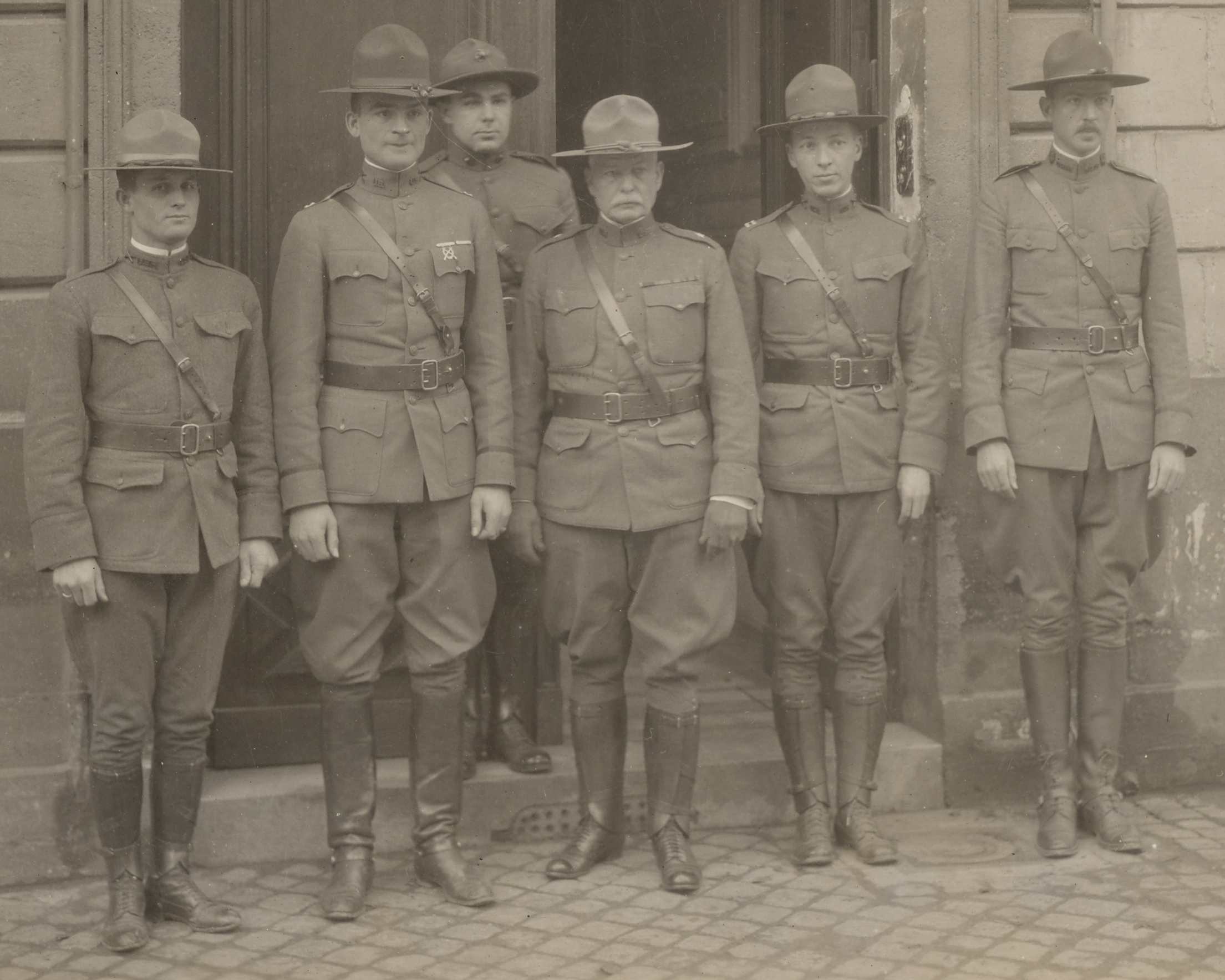
Major General Hugh L. Scott and members of his staff at a base hospital, December 1917

In March 1913, Scott was promoted to brigadier general in command of the 2nd Cavalry Brigade, still posted to the Southwest. He won a special commendation for his skillful handling of Navajo disturbances at Beautiful Mountain, Arizona, in November 1913. He was named assistant chief of staff in April 1914 and chief of staff of the United States Army from 1914 to 1917, including the first few months of American involvement in World War I. He was promoted to major general in April 1915. He continued to act in a diplomatic role with Indians and Mexican border officials in the Southwest, settling problems with the Paiutes of Utah in March 1915 and recovering property "confiscated" by Pancho Villa in August.

=== World War I ===
From February to March 1916, Scott served as ad-interim secretary of war but his energies were directed more toward preparation for possible U.S. entry into World War I. He was very influential in winning early acceptance among civil officials of the notion of conscription.

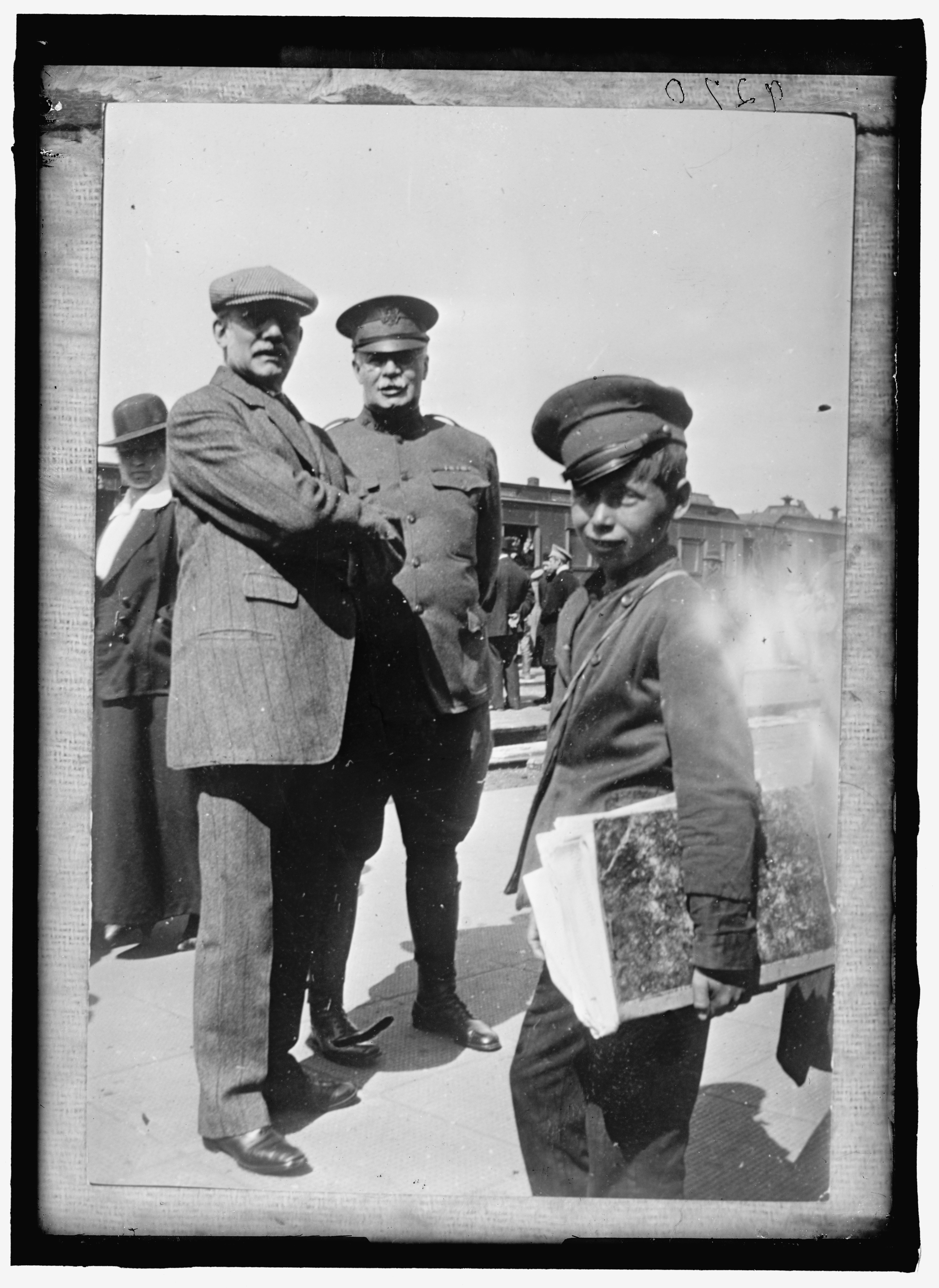
Major General Hugh L. Scott on the Russian Eastern Front, 1917

From May to August 1917, after the official American entry into World War I, he was sent to Russia as a member of the Root Mission, led by Elihu Root, with the intention of keeping Russia in the war.

He retired at the statutory age of 64 on 22 September 1917 and was succeeded as chief of staff by Tasker H. Bliss. Scott was immediately recalled to active duty. He served stateside and became commander of the 78th Division at Camp Dix, New Jersey, in December and of Camp Dix again in March 1918. His services during the war resulted in him being awarded the Army Distinguished Service Medal.

== Retirement ==
Scott retired finally in May 1919 and served on the Board of Indian Commissioners from 1919 to 1929 and was chairman of the New Jersey State Highway Commission from 1923 to 1933. In 1928, Scott published an autobiography, Some Memories of a Soldier, a memoir of his 41 years in the United States Army.

=== Preservation of Plains Indian Sign Language ===
Extracts of the films taken during the 1930 Conference on PISL conservation, showing Scott and signers from various tribes

Scott worked heavily with the Bureau of American Ethnology to preserve Plains Indian Sign Language (PISL), also called American Indian Sign Language (AISL), a now endangered form of sign language once utilized heavily by Plains Indians as a lingua franca with other tribes and Europeans. Scott first learned PISL from a Kiowa soldier, I-See-O, during his time in the military, particularly while stationed at Fort Sill with Troop L of the 7th Cavalry.

Throughout the 1930s Scott, Richard Sanderville, and others engaged heavily with various tribes in order to compile what later became known as the The Indian Sign Language (1930). The Indian Sign Language was a silent short film which was filmed during the Indian Sign Language Grand Council which highlighted the uniqueness of PISL and its endangerment as an auxiliary form of communication. The council for the film was held in September 1930 in Montana and was hosted by the Blackfeet Nation, the council consisted of 18 participants from 12 different tribes and language groups, all of which knew PISL. Following Scott's death in 1934, Sanderville continued Scott's work by creating the Dictionary of Indian Sign Language (1930/1, 1934), a filmed dictionary of various hand signs.

== Death and legacy ==
Scott died in Washington, D.C., on April 30, 1934, and was buried among many other family members in Section 2 of Arlington National Cemetery.

There is a large bas relief memorial plaque in his honor in the Washington National Cathedral. His papers are held by the Library of Congress and Princeton University.

The various Army bases previously named for Confederate generals received those names on Scott's watch as Chief of Staff, even though it took place during his participation in the Root Mission to the Russian Provisional Government.

=== Namesake ===
- The US Navy lead transport ship USS Hugh L. Scott (AP-43)
- Scott Middle School in Fort Knox, Kentucky

=== In popular culture ===
General Scott appears as a character in The Friends of Pancho Villa (1996), a historical novel by James Carlos Blake.

== Awards ==
- Distinguished Service Medal
- Indian Campaign Medal
- Spanish War Service Medal
- Philippine Campaign Medal
- Army of Cuban Occupation Medal
- Mexican Service Medal
- Victory Medal

== Dates of rank ==
United States Military Academy Cadet – class of 1876

Insignia	Rank	Component	Date
No pin insignia in 1876	Second lieutenant	Regular Army	15 June 1876
	First lieutenant	Regular Army	28 June 1878
	Captain	Regular Army	24 January 1895
	Major	Volunteers	12 May 1898
	Lieutenant colonel	Volunteers	17 August 1899
	Major	Regular Army	25 February 1903
	Colonel (temporary)	Regular Army	31 August 1906
	Lieutenant colonel	Regular Army	3 March 1911
	Colonel	Regular Army	18 August 1911
	Brigadier general	Regular Army	23 March 1913
	Major general	Regular Army	30 April 1915
	Major general	Retired List	22 September 1917

== Works ==
- Some Memories of a Soldier (1928), New York : The Century Company, xvii, 673 p., [52] leaves of plates.
- Selected Kiowa Stories from the Papers of Hugh Lenox Scott (1920; Digitized page images & text)

== Works cited ==
=== Books ===
- Hayden, Horace Edwin, ed. (1906). Genealogical and Family History of the Wyoming and Lackawanna Valleys Pennsylvania. Vol. I. New York: Lewis Publishing Company.
- Davis, Henry Blaine Jr. (1998). Generals in Khaki. Raleigh, North Carolina: Pentland Press. ISBN 1571970886. OCLC 40298151.
- Parton, James (1864). Life and Times of Benjamin Franklin. Vol. II. New York: Mercer Brothers.
- Venzon, Anne Cipriano (2013). The United States in the First World War: an Encyclopedia. Hoboken, NJ: Taylor and Francis. ISBN 978-1-135-68453-2. OCLC 865332376.

=== Journals ===
- Moser, A. P. (2025). "Hugh Lenox Scott, Molay-Tay-Quop: The Altruistic Soldier of Fort Sill". Chronicles of Oklahoma. 102 (4). Oklahoma Historical Society: 415–439.
- Swett, Morris (1935). "Sergeant I-See-O, Kiowa Indian Scout" (PDF). Chronicles of Oklahoma. 13 (3). Oklahoma Historical Society: 341–354.

Military offices
Preceded by Albert Leopold Mills	Superintendents of the United States Military Academy; 1906–1910	Succeeded by Thomas Henry Barry
Preceded by William W. Wotherspoon	Chief of Staff of the United States Army; 1914–1917	Succeeded by Tasker H. Bliss
Preceded by James T. Dean	Commanding General 78th Division; January–March 1918	Succeeded by James T. Dean
