= I-See-O =

Kiowa-American soldier (c.1849–1927)

First Sergeant (U.S. Army) I-See-O
- Áiséñ:aui
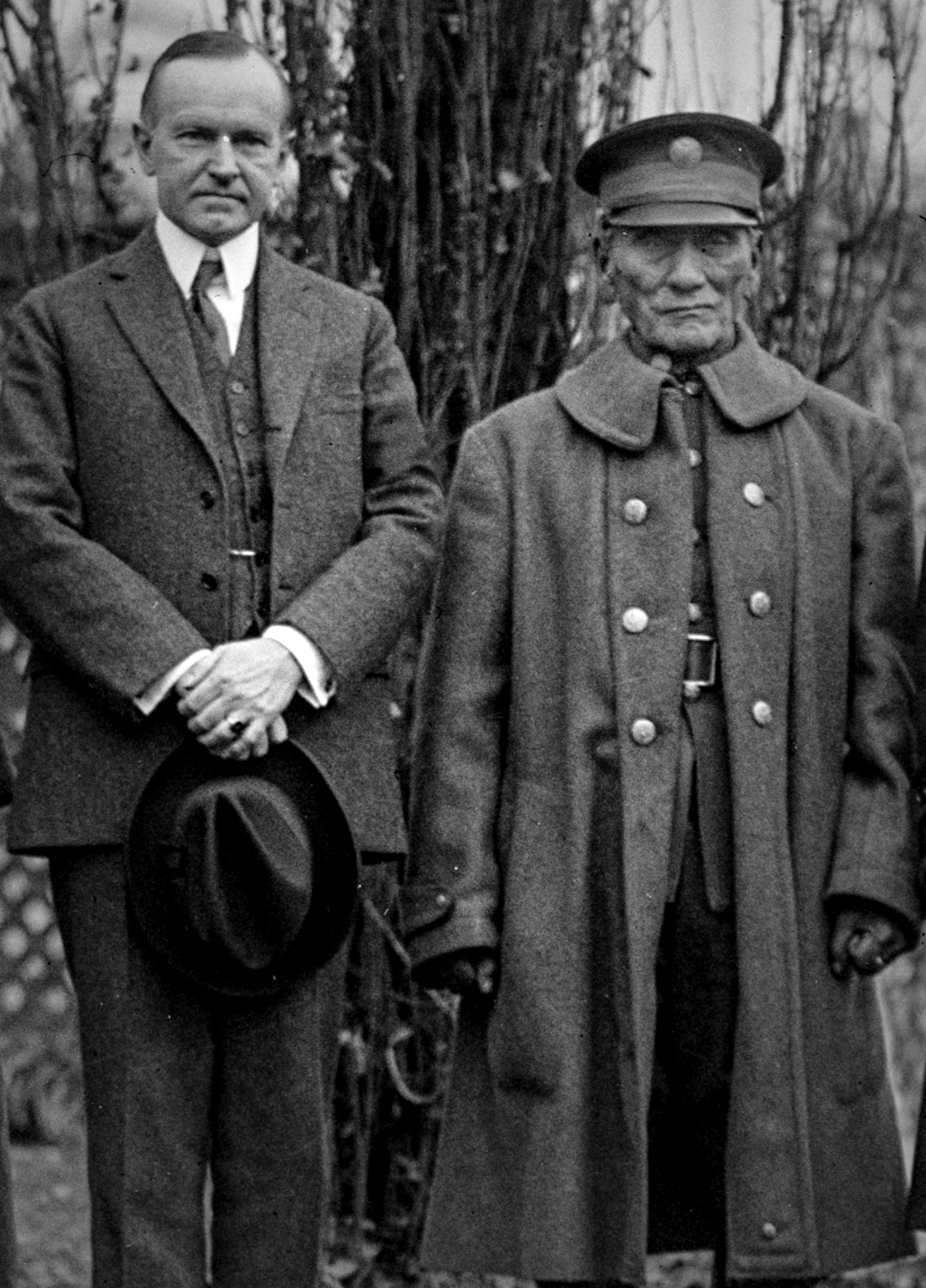
- President Calvin Coolidge and Sgt. I-See-O in the Rose Garden of the White House in 1925
- Born: Tahbonemah c. 1849; Central Great Plains, Indian Territory
- Died: March 11, 1927 (99 years ago)
- Burial place: Fort Sill Post Cemetery
- Children: 5
- Military career
- Allegiance: United States
- Branch: United States Army
- Service years: 1883-1913 and 1915-1927
- Rank: First Sergeant
- Nickname: Plenty Fires
- Unit: 7th Cavalry
- Conflicts: American Indian Wars Spanish American War World War I
- Awards: Indian Campaign Medal Spanish War Service Medal Mexican Border Service Medal Victory Medal

I-See-O (Kiowa: Áiséñ:aui), also known as Tahbonemah, (c. 1849 to 1927) was a Kiowa-American soldier who served as an officer in the United States Army for nearly fifty years in the Seventh Cavalry and was the few remaining active duty U.S. Army Indian Scouts upon his death in 1927.

I-See-O enlisted in 1889 and served alongside future General Hugh L. Scott, teaching him the intricacies of indigenous warfare and Native American sign language. I-See-O quickly gained a reputation as a diplomat during his early service in the American Indian Wars, keeping the peace among the Native American nations in the Indian Territory during the Ghost Dance religious movement of 1889-90. He continued his service as a personal courier to General Nelson A. Miles for several years and re-enlisted at the outbreak of the Spanish-American War in 1897. In 1915, the United States Congress passed a law in recognition of his service making him an active duty sergeant for life. I-See-O continued his service at Fort Sill until his death in 1927.

== Naming and early life ==
I-See-O was born in the ancestral Kiowa homeland along the Central Great Plains in the Indian Territory in the area of modern-day Fort Larned National Historic Site in Kansas. In 1867, he witnessed the treaty negotiations between the Kiowa and the United States near the Medicine Lodge River. The negotiations at Medicine Lodge resulted in three treaties between the United States and three Native American nations: the Kiowa, the Comanche, and the Plains Apache. The Americans dispatched treaty negotiators, known as the Indian Peace Commission, to negotiate treaties with these nations for the purpose of acquiring vast amounts of land and forcing them onto reservations in Indian Territory. The lead American negotiator was General William Tecumseh Sherman. The Kiowa were represented by a delegation led by Satank, Satanta, and Kicking Bird. The negotiations ended with the signing of the Medicine Lodge Treaty on October 21, 1867; however, the treaty failed to bring peace to the region and only resulted in an increase in American settlers pouring into the region. This led to an armed resistance movement across the Southern Plains and I-See-O joined Lone Wolf and Comanche war leader Quanah Parker in resisting the United States across the Southern Plains for the next seven years. After a military defeat in the Battle of Palo Duro Canyon, Lone Wolf ended the Kiowa resistance and surrendered to American military officials at Fort Sill on February 25, 1875. I-See-O was among those in Lone Wolf's party when he surrendered. Late in his life, I-See-O was able to identify the exact location where the Medicine Lodge Treaty was negotiated and signed for a commission which wanted to build a monument to the event.

== Military career ==
L-R: Sgt. I-See-O and Capt. Hugh L. Scott accompany Maj. Gen. Nelson A. Miles on a hunting expedition in the 1890s

In 1883 I-See-O (then using the name Tah-Bone-Ma) served as a private in the Indian Police of the Indian Territory (which would later become the state of Oklahoma) and was paid five dollars a month.

I-See-O (under the name of Tah-Bone-Ma) was listed on the April 30, 1889, census of the Kiowa tribe. He is listed as being 40 years old along with his 38 year old wife Pau-to-mah, two daughters (ages 15 and 10) and a five-year-old son.

About 1889, I-See-O enlisted in the 7th Cavalry in 1889 and I-See-O taught future Army Chief of Staff Hugh L. Scott (then a lieutenant) Native American sign language and techniques of frontier warfare. When Scott was given command of Troop L of the regiment, he has I-See-O serve as his first sergeant. I-See-O and Scott worked together closely until Scott was reassigned in 1897.

During the Ghost Dance phenomenon of the early 1890s, I-See-O helped in persuading the Apache and Kiowa tribes not to go to war. This action, while serving the interest of white settlers and speculators, undoubtedly also saved the lives of many Native Americans and would later save his own. Scott's gratitude to I-See-O was such that, when he was Chief of Staff of the Army, he allowed for Sergeant I-See-O to remain on active duty for life.

I-See-O re-enlisted in the United States Army Indian Scouts for three years on February 26, 1897, as a private and served under future U.S. Army Chief of Staff First Lieutenant Hugh L. Scott. When his enlistment expired, I-See-O re-enlisted for three years on February 26, 1900, and was soon after promoted to sergeant.

In 1913, I-See-O (about the age of 64) left the Army and went to live with his family in the Big Bend of the Washita River. Having lived in pre-industrial environments all his life, he was stunned by the complexities of modern life and was reduced to poverty as he lacked employable skills.

Fortunately for I-See-O, his old friend Lieutenant, now Major General, Hugh L. Scott was Chief of Staff of the United States Army. Scott heard about I-See-O's difficulties and made a personal appeal to the Secretary of War in his behalf. As a result, I-See-O was re-enlisted at Fort Myer, Virginia on January 31, 1915, as a sergeant, and assigned to the Fort Sill Detachment of Indian Scouts. I-See-O was the only member of the unit and had the distinction of being the last living Kiowa Indian Scout in the U.S. Army.

General Scott, in a letter to the commanding officer at Fort Sill, dated February 1, 1915, said: "I would like to have you let him live on the reservation or out among his people, as he elects, and see that he gets pay, clothing, and rations from your Quartermaster, and that when his time expires he be re-enlisted as a sergeant until he dies. He is old and medieval, his mind is back in the middle ages, and he has simply been stunned by civilization. I do not see how he survived this long. When the government needed him he was supremely loyal, against the wishes of his own people."

In January 1925, I-See-O visited President Calvin Coolidge at the White House with other members of the Kiowa.

== Death ==
Sgt. I-See-O died on March 11, 1927, in Lawton, Oklahoma. He is buried in Fort Still Post Cemetery in Fort Sill, Oklahoma.

== Awards ==
United States decorations and medals
Indian Campaign Medal	Spanish War Service Medal	Mexican Border Service Medal	World War I Victory Medal
