= Traditional Circle of Indian Elders & Youth =

Native American organization

Coordinates: 45.68031°N 111.04385°W

The Traditional Circle of Indian Elders and Youth, established in 1977, is a native American cultural society which operates as a council of respected leaders of American Indian nations. It aims to renew and preserve native American culture, values, and worldview at a grass-roots level, and to provide avenues for that culture to inform and contribute to contemporary cultural and political debate. The Circle's office is located in Bozeman, Montana.

The Circle holds an annual conference.

Following their annual council gathering, the Traditional Circle often issues a communiqué to the leaders of the world at large — simply worded messages outlining problems of concern to Native Americans and non-Indians alike, and putting out a call for action. Past communiqués have dealt with the loss of sacred traditions and language, social problems, and, very often, environmental degradation.

The American Indian Institute acts as the Traditional Circle's sponsoring agent. "The non-Indian circle of the AII ... [assists] the Traditional Circle in carrying out its mission and its messages."

Founding members include Joe Medicine Crow, recipient of the Presidential Medal of Freedom, and Chief Oren Lyons of the Onondaga Council of Chiefs.

Steve Talbot wrote: "In a 1992 communique, the Traditional Circle of Indian Elders and Youth directly linked the abridgment of Indian religious freedom to the Doctrine of Christian Nations and the 1823 Johnson v. McIntosh decision that embodies it."

Mohawk documentary film-maker Danny Beaton talked in an interview about "a sacred circle of grassroots spiritual Elders in Montana called the Traditional Circle of Indian Elders and Youth."
