= Counting coup =

Touching an enemy to win prestige among the Plains Indians

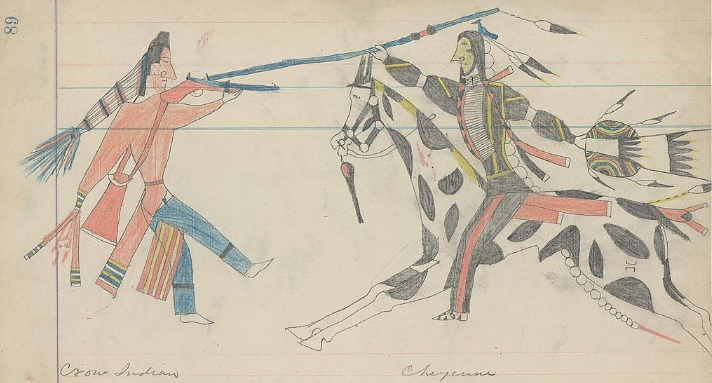
Ledger drawing of a mounted Cheyenne warrior counting coup with lance on a dismounted Crow warrior, 1880s.

Among the Plains Indians of North America, counting coup (/kuː/) (coup is French for 'blow' or 'shock') is the warrior tradition of winning prestige against an enemy in battle. It is one of the traditional ways of showing bravery in the face of an enemy and involves intimidating him, and, it is hoped, persuading him to admit defeat, without having to kill him. These victories may then be remembered, recorded, and recounted as part of the community's oral, written, or pictorial histories.

== Historical precedents ==
Historically, any blow struck against the enemy counted as a coup, but the most prestigious acts included touching an enemy warrior with a hand, bow, or coup stick and escaping unharmed, and without harming the enemy, except for the enemy's wounded pride.

Touching the first enemy to die in battle or touching the enemy's defensive works was also considered counting coup, as was, in some nations, simply riding up to an enemy, touching him with a short stick, and riding away unscathed. Counting coup has at times also involved stealing an enemy's weapons or horses tied up to his lodge in camp. Risk of injury or death is traditionally required to count coup. Escaping unharmed while counting coup is traditionally considered a higher honor than being wounded in the attempt.

After a battle or exploit, the people of a band gathered to recount their acts of bravery. Coups have been recorded by putting notches in a coup stick. Indigenous peoples of the Pacific Northwest traditionally tied an eagle feather to their coup sticks for each coup counted. Among the Blackfoot nation of the upper Missouri River Valley, coup was recorded by the placement of "coup bars" on the sleeves and shoulders of special shirts bearing paintings of the warrior's exploits in battle. Many shirts of this sort have survived to the present, including some in European museums. In some tribes, a warrior who won coup was permitted to wear an eagle feather in his hair, and if wounded in the attempt, was required to paint the feather red to indicate this.

== Modern accounts ==
Joe Medicine Crow (1913–2016) is credited with achieving the feat while serving with the US Army during World War II, as on one occasion he overpowered and disarmed a German soldier, and later stole horses from an SS unit.

== Bibliography ==
- Plenty Coups and Linderman, Frank Bird. Plenty-Coups, Chief of the Crows. Lincoln, Neb.: University of Nebraska Press, 2002.
