= Indian Campaign Medal =

- Obverse
- Type: Campaign medal
- Awarded for: Service in enumerated campaigns or "against hostile Indians in any other action in which United States troops were killed or wounded between 1865 and 1891."
- Presented by: the Department of War
- ribbon and streamer

The Indian Campaign Medal is a decoration established by War Department General Orders 12, 1907. The medal was retroactively awarded to any soldier of the U.S. Army who had participated in the American Indian Wars against the Native Americans between 1865 and 1891.

== Background ==
The Indian Campaign Medal was established by War Department General Orders 12 in 1907. It was created at the same time as the Civil War Campaign Medal.

The initial ribbon was all red; however, two black stripes were added in December 1917 because of the similarity to a ribbon used by the French for the French Legion of Honor.

Campaign streamers of the same design as the service ribbon are authorized for display by units receiving campaign credit participation for Indian Wars as early as 1790. The inscriptions for streamers displayed on the organizational flag will be as indicated in the unit's lineage and honors. The inscriptions for the 14 streamers displayed on the Army flag are listed in AR 840-10 and AR 600-8-22.

== Eligible campaigns ==
The service in the following campaigns are eligible for award of the Indian Campaign Medal:

1. Southern Oregon, Idaho, northern California, and Nevada between 1865 and 1868.
2. Against the Comanches and confederate tribes in Kansas, Colorado, Texas, New Mexico, and Indian Territory between 1867 and 1875.
3. Modoc War between 1872 and 1873.
4. Against the Apaches in Arizona in 1873.
5. Against the Northern Cheyennes and Sioux between 1876 and 1877.
6. Nez Perce War in 1877.
7. Bannock War in 1878.
8. Against the Northern Cheyennes between 1878 and 1879.
9. Against the Sheep-Eaters, Piutes, and Bannocks between June and October, 1879.
10. Meeker Massacre against the Utes in Colorado and Utah between September 1879 and November 1880.
11. Against the Apaches in Arizona and New Mexico between 1885 and 1886.
12. Wounded Knee Massacre against the Sioux in South Dakota between November 1890 and January 1891.
13. Against hostile Indians in any other action in which United States troops were killed or wounded between 1865 and 1891.

== Appearance ==
The Code of Federal Regulations describes the medal as follows:

The medal of bronze is 11/4 inches in diameter. On the obverse is a mounted Indian facing sinister, wearing a war bonnet, and carrying a spear in his right hand. Above the horseman are the words ‘'Indian Wars,’’ and below, on either side of a buffalo skull, the circle is completed by arrowheads, conventionally arranged. On the reverse is a trophy, composed of an eagle perched on a cannon supported by crossed flags, rifles, an Indian shield, spear, and quiver of arrows, a Cuban machete, and a Sulu kriss. Below the trophy are the words ‘'For Service.'’ The whole is surrounded by a circle composed of the words ‘'United States Army'’ in the upper half and thirteen stars in the lower half. The medal is suspended by a ring from a silk moire ribbon 13/8inches in length and 13/8 inches in width composed of a red stripe (1/4-inch), black stripe (3/16-inch), red band (1/2inch), black stripe (3/16-inch), and red stripe (1/4-inch).

The Indian Campaign Medal was issued as a one-time decoration only and there were no devices or service stars authorized for those who had participated in multiple actions. The only attachment authorized to the medal was the silver citation star, awarded for meritorious or heroic conduct. The silver citation star was the predecessor of the Silver Star and was awarded to eleven soldiers between 1865 and 1891.

As originally issued, the medal had a solid red ribbon. In 1917 two black stripes were added to the ribbon. The reason for this change is that the ribbon of the Indian Campaign Medal was easily confused with the ribbon of the French Legion of Honor which also had a solid red ribbon.

== Gallery ==
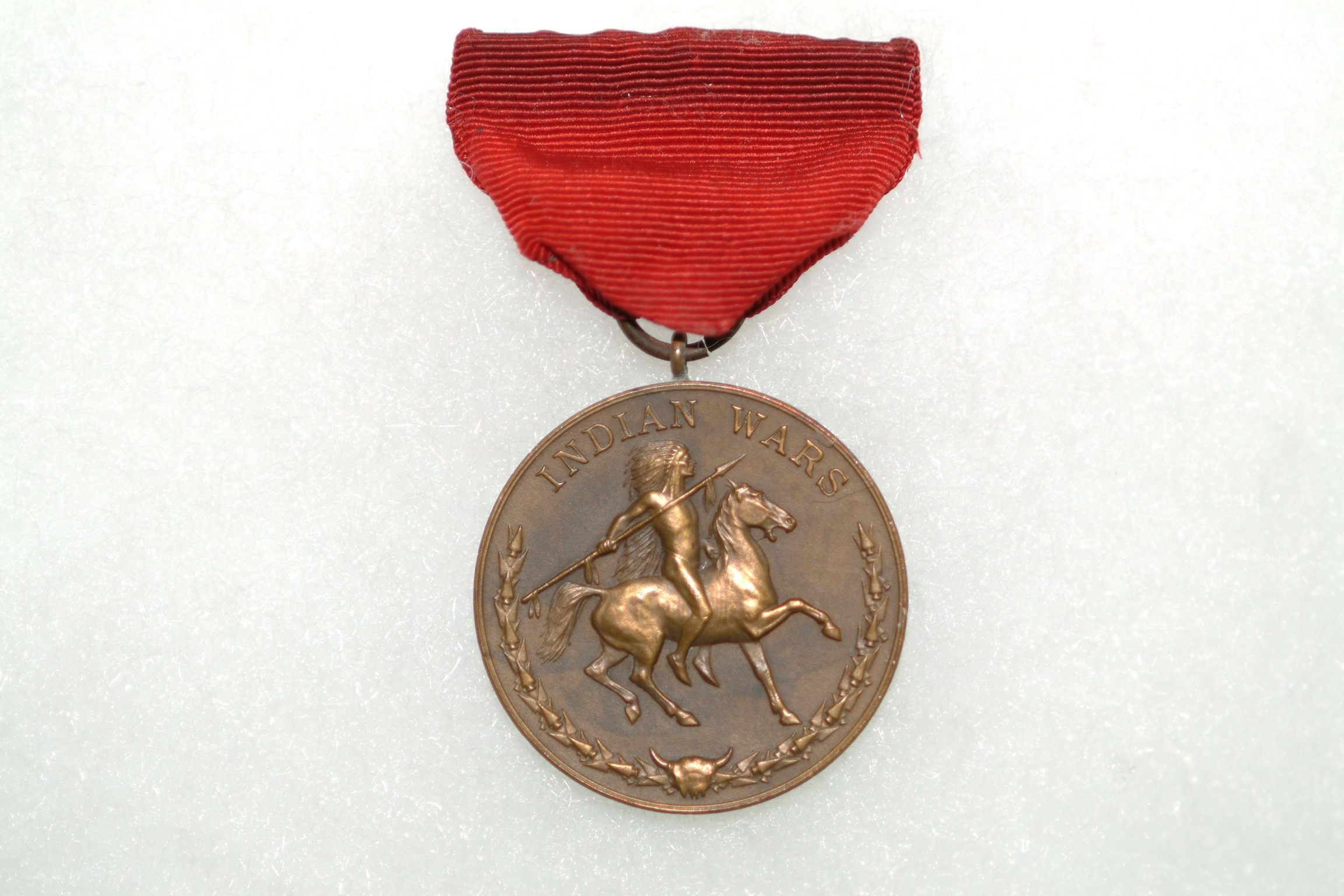
Obverse, pre-1917

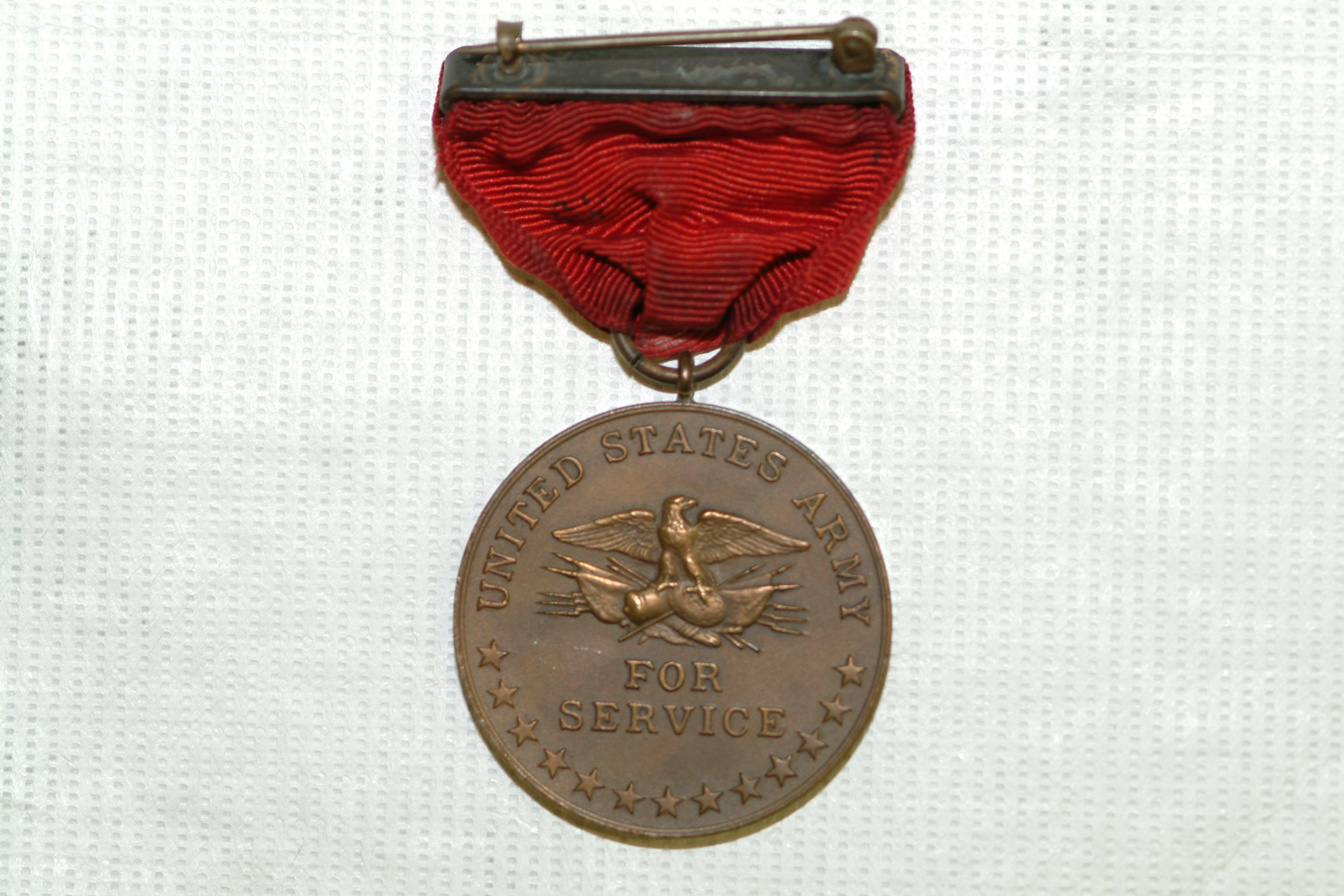
Reverse, pre-1917

Obverse with ribbon used after 1917

== See also ==
- Awards and decorations of the United States military
- U.S. military history: Indian conflicts, wars, battles, expeditions and campaigns
