= Battle of the Little Bighorn =

1876 battle of the Great Sioux War

- Part of the Great Sioux War of 1876
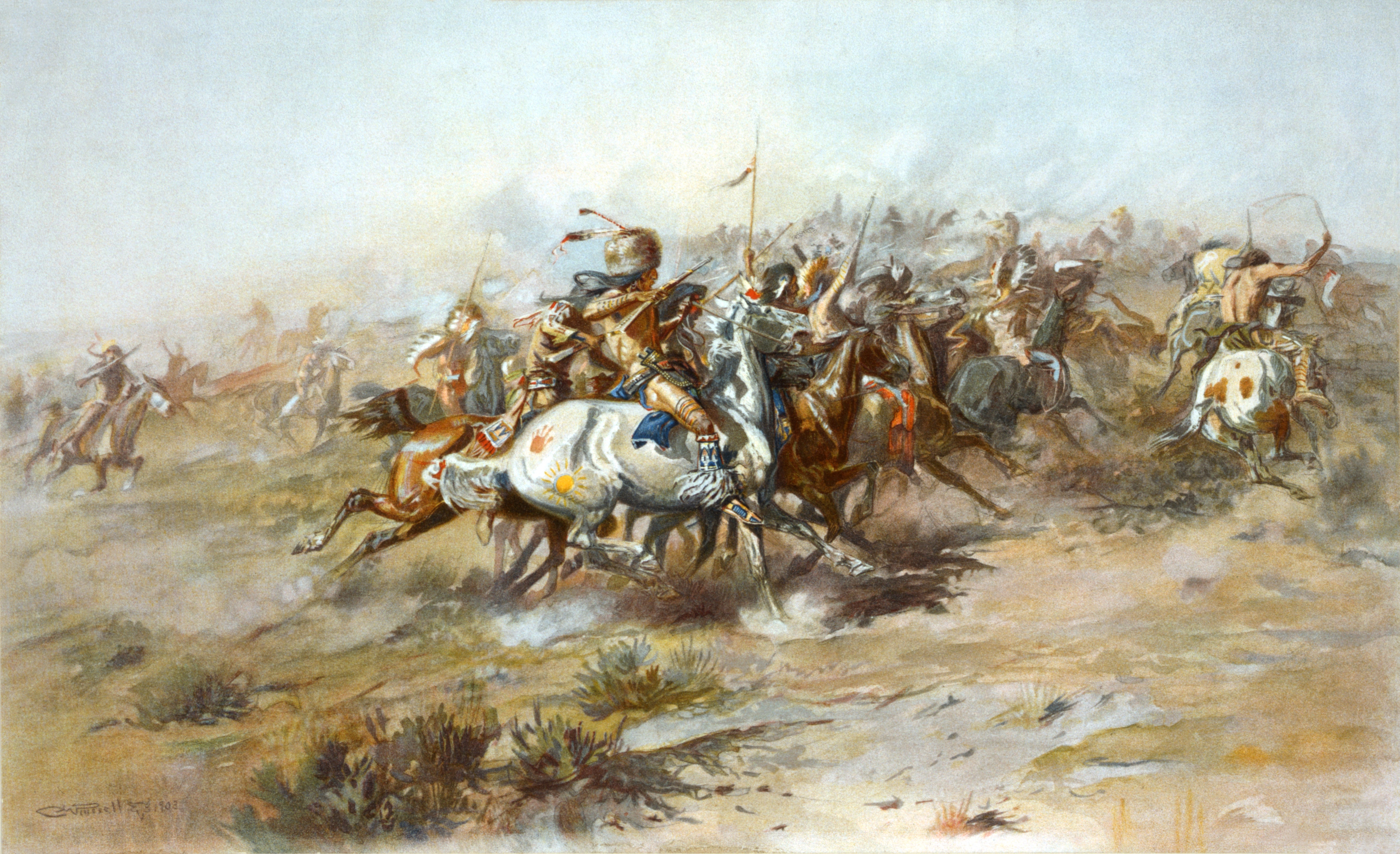
- The Custer Fight; Charles Marion Russell, 1903
Date	June 25–26, 1876
Location	Near Little Bighorn River, Montana, U.S. 45°33′54″N 107°25′44″W
Result	Lakota, Northern Cheyenne, and Arapaho victory

Belligerents
Lakota; Dakota; Northern Cheyenne; Arapaho	United States; Crow scouts; Arikara scouts

Commanders and leaders
Sitting Bull; Crazy Horse; Chief Gall; Lame White Man †; Two Moons	George A. Custer †; Marcus A. Reno; Frederick W. Benteen; Myles W. Keogh †; James Calhoun †

Units involved
Nations of the plains	7th Cavalry Regiment

Strength
1,100–2,500 warriors	c. 700 cavalrymen and scouts

Casualties and losses
31–100 killed; Up to 160 wounded; 10 non-combatants killed	268 killed; 49 wounded
- Location within Montana

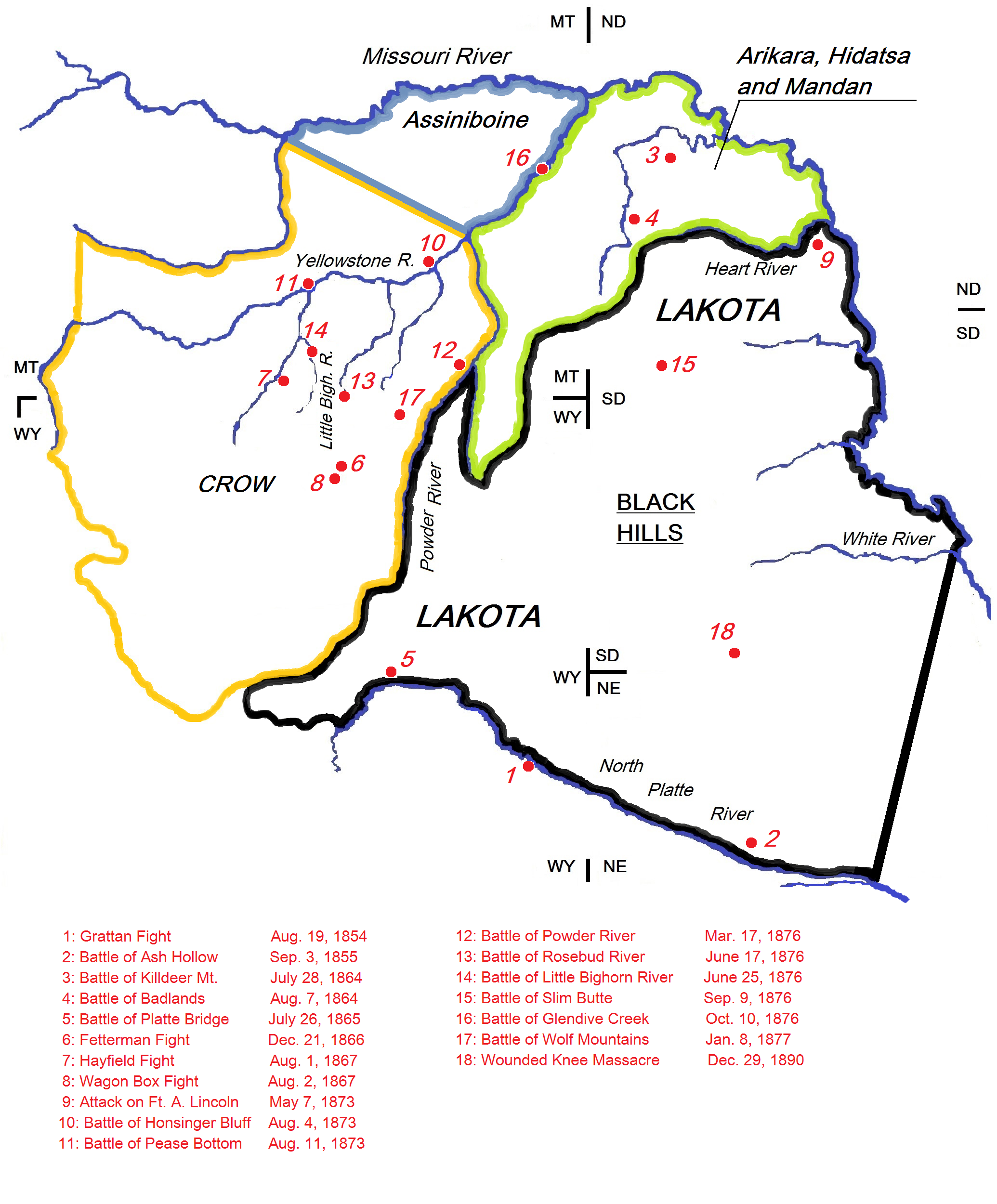
Map indicating the battlefields of the Lakota wars (1854–1890) and the Lakota Indian territory as described in the Treaty of Fort Laramie (1851). The Battle of the Little Bighorn is #14.

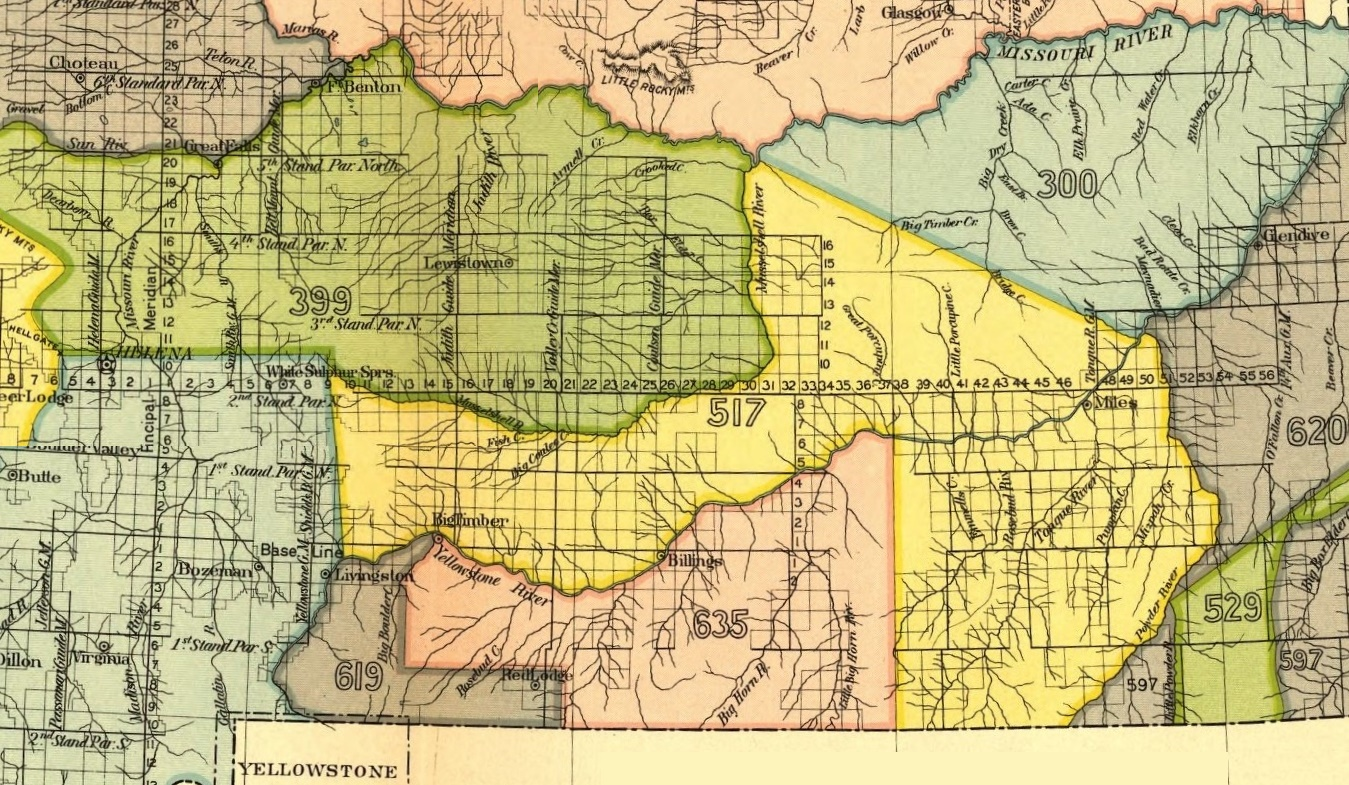
Crow Indian Reservation, 1868 (area 619 and 635). Yellow area 517 is 1851 Crow treaty land ceded to the U.S. It was in the red area 635 that the battle occurred.

The 1876 Battle of the Little Bighorn, commonly referred to as Custer's Last Stand and known to the Lakota and other Plains Indians as the Battle of the Greasy Grass, was an armed engagement between combined forces of the Lakota Sioux, Northern Cheyenne, and Arapaho tribes and the 7th Cavalry Regiment of the United States Army. It took place on June 25–26, 1876, along the Little Bighorn River in the Crow Indian Reservation in southeastern Montana Territory. The battle, which resulted in the defeat of U.S. forces, was the most significant action of the Great Sioux War of 1876.

Most battles in the Great Sioux War, including the Battle of the Little Bighorn, were on lands those natives had taken from other tribes since 1851. The Lakota were there without consent from the local Crow tribe, which had a treaty claim on the area. Already in 1873, Crow chief Blackfoot had called for U.S. military actions against the native intruders. The steady Lakota incursions into treaty areas belonging to the smaller tribes were a direct result of their displacement by the United States in and around Fort Laramie, as well as in reaction to white encroachment into the Black Hills, which the Lakota consider sacred. This pre-existing Indian conflict provided a useful wedge for colonization and ensured the United States a firm Indian alliance with the Arikaras and the Crows during the Lakota Wars.

The fight was an overwhelming victory for the Lakota, Northern Cheyenne, and Arapaho, who were led by several major war leaders, including Crazy Horse and Chief Gall and had been inspired by the visions of Sitting Bull (Tȟatȟáŋka Íyotake). The U.S. 7th Cavalry, a force of 700 men commanded by Lieutenant Colonel George Armstrong Custer (a brevetted major general during the American Civil War), suffered a major defeat. 5 of the 12 groups from 7th cavalry were wiped out and Custer was killed, as were two of his brothers, his nephew, and his brother-in-law. The total U.S. casualty count included 268 dead and 55 severely wounded (six died later from their wounds), including four Crow Indian scouts and at least two Arikara Indian scouts.

Public response to the Great Sioux War varied in the immediate aftermath of the battle. Custer's widow Libbie Custer soon began to work to burnish her husband's memory, and during the following decades, Custer and his troops came to be widely considered to be heroic figures in U.S. history. The battle and Custer's actions in particular have been studied extensively by historians. Custer's heroic public image began to tarnish after the death of his widow in 1933 and the publication in 1934 of Glory Hunter – The Life of General Custer by Frederic F. Van de Water, which was the first book to depict Custer in unheroic terms. These two events, combined with the cynicism of an economic depression and historical revisionism, led to a somewhat revised view of Custer and his defeat on the banks of the Little Bighorn River. Little Bighorn Battlefield National Monument honors those who fought on both sides.

== Background ==
=== Battlefield and surrounding areas ===
In 1805, fur trader François Antoine Larocque reported joining a Crow camp in the Yellowstone area. On the way he noted that the Crow hunted buffalo on the "Small Horn River". St. Louis-based fur trader Manuel Lisa built Fort Raymond in 1807 for trade with the Crow. It was located near the confluence of the Yellowstone and Bighorn rivers, about 41.6 miles (67 km) north of the future battlefield. The area is first noted in the 1851 Treaty of Fort Laramie.

In the latter half of the 19th century, tensions increased between the Native inhabitants of the Great Plains of the US and encroaching settlers. This resulted in a series of conflicts known as the Sioux Wars, which took place from 1854 to 1890. While some of the indigenous people eventually agreed to relocate to ever-shrinking reservations, a number of them resisted, sometimes fiercely.

On May 7, 1868, the valley of the Little Bighorn became a tract in the eastern part of the new Crow Indian Reservation in the center of the old Crow country. There were numerous skirmishes between the Sioux and Crow tribes, so when the Sioux were in the valley in 1876 without the consent of the Crow tribe, the Crow supported the US Army to expel the Sioux (e.g., Crows enlisted as Army scouts and Crow warriors would fight in the nearby Battle of the Rosebud).

The geography of the battlefield is very complex, consisting of dissected uplands, rugged bluffs, the Little Bighorn River, and adjacent plains, all areas close to one another. Vegetation varies widely from one area to the next.

The battlefield is known as "Greasy Grass" to the Lakota Sioux, Dakota Sioux, Cheyenne, and most other Plains Indians; however, in contemporary accounts by participants, it was referred to as the "Valley of Chieftains".

=== 1876 Sun Dance ceremony ===
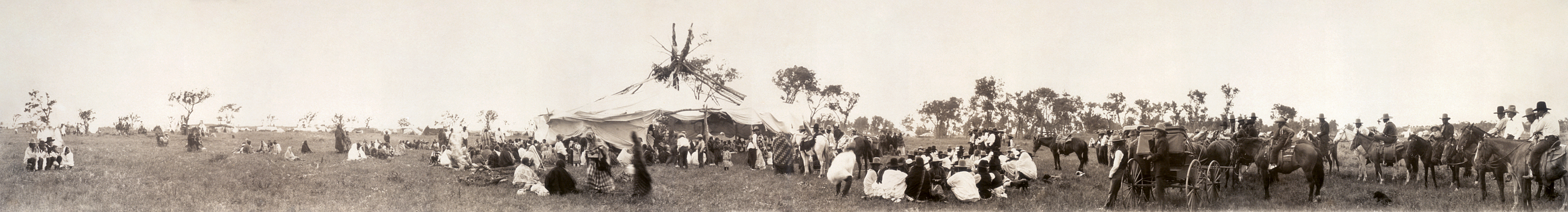
A Cheyenne Sun Dance gathering, c. 1909

Among the Plains Indians, the long-standing ceremonial tradition known as the Sun Dance was the most important religious event of the year. It is a time for prayer and personal sacrifice for the community, as well as for making personal vows and resolutions. Towards the end of spring in 1876, the Lakota and the Cheyenne held a Sun Dance that was also attended by some "agency Indians" who had slipped away from their reservations. During a Sun Dance around June 5, 1876, on Rosebud Creek in Montana, Sitting Bull, the spiritual leader of the Hunkpapa Lakota, reportedly had a vision of "soldiers falling into his camp like grasshoppers from the sky." At the same time US military officials were conducting a summer campaign to force the Lakota and the Cheyenne back to their reservations, using infantry and cavalry in a so-called "three-pronged approach".

=== 1876 U.S. military campaign ===
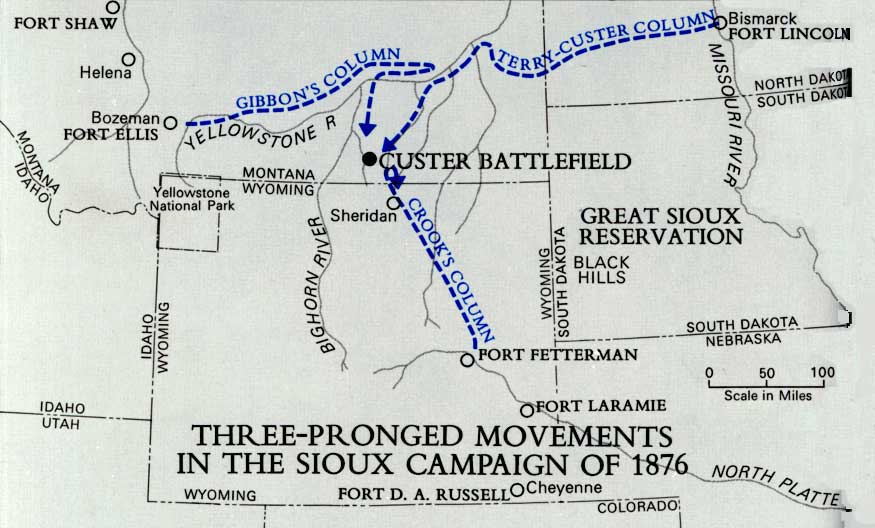
1876 US Army campaign against the Sioux

Col. John Gibbon's column of six companies (A, B, E, H, I, and K) of the 7th Infantry and four troops (F, G, H, and L) of the 2nd Cavalry marched east from Fort Ellis in western Montana on March 30 to patrol the Yellowstone River. Brig. Gen. George Crook's column of ten troops (A, B, C, D, E, F, G, I, L, and M) of the 3rd Cavalry, five troops (A, B, D, E, and I) of the 2nd Cavalry, two companies (D and F) of the 4th Infantry, and three companies (C, G, and H) of the 9th Infantry moved north from Fort Fetterman in the Wyoming Territory on May 29, marching toward the Powder River area. Brig. Gen. Alfred Terry's column, including twelve troops (A, B, C, D, E, F, G, H, I, K, L, and M) of the 7th Cavalry under Lt. Col. George Armstrong Custer's immediate command Companies C and G of the 17th Infantry, and the Gatling gun detachment of the 20th Infantry departed westward from Fort Abraham Lincoln in the Dakota Territory on May 17. They were accompanied by teamsters and packers with 150 wagons and a large contingent of pack mules that reinforced Custer. Companies C, D, and I of the 6th Infantry moved along the Yellowstone River from Fort Buford on the Missouri River to set up a supply depot and joined Terry on May 29 at the mouth of the Powder River. They were later joined there by the steamboat Far West, which was loaded with 200 tons of supplies from Fort Abraham Lincoln.

==== 7th Cavalry organization ====
The 7th Cavalry had been created just after the American Civil War (1861–1865). Many men were veterans of the war, including most of the leading officers. A significant portion of the regiment had previously served 4½ years at Fort Riley, in Kansas, during which time it fought one major engagement and numerous skirmishes, experiencing casualties of 36 killed and 27 wounded. Six other troopers had died of drowning and 51 in cholera epidemics. In November 1868, while stationed in Kansas, the 7th Cavalry under Custer had routed Black Kettle's Southern Cheyenne camp on the Washita River in the Battle of Washita River, an attack which was at the time labeled a "massacre of innocent Indians" by the Indian Bureau.

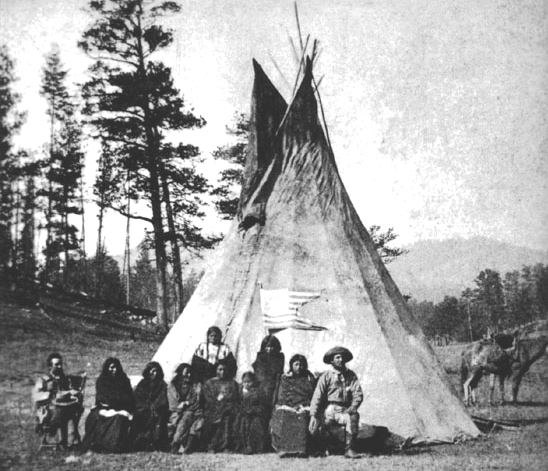
U.S. Army 7th Cavalry Regiment's Troop "I" guidon banner recovered at the camp of American Horse the Elder, c.1876

By the time of the Battle of the Little Bighorn, half of the 7th Cavalry's companies had just returned from 18 months of constabulary duty in the Deep South, having been recalled to Fort Abraham Lincoln, Dakota Territory to reassemble the regiment for the campaign. About 20% of the troopers had been enlisted in the prior seven months (139 of an enlisted roll of 718), were only marginally trained and had no combat or frontier experience. About 60% of these recruits were American, the rest were European immigrants (primarily Irish and German)—just as many of the veteran troopers had been before their enlistments. Archaeological evidence suggests that many of these troopers were malnourished and in poor physical condition, despite being the best-equipped and supplied regiment in the Army.

Of the 45 officers and 718 troopers then assigned to the 7th Cavalry (including a second lieutenant detached from the 20th Infantry and serving in Company L), 14 officers (including the regimental commander) and 152 troopers did not accompany the 7th during the campaign. The regimental commander Colonel Samuel D. Sturgis was on detached duty as the Superintendent of Mounted Recruiting Service and commander of the Cavalry Depot in St. Louis, Missouri, which left Lieutenant Colonel Custer in command of the regiment. The ratio of troops detached for other duty (approximately 22%) was not unusual for an expedition of this size, and part of the officer shortage was chronic and was due to the Army's rigid seniority system: Three of the regiment's twelve captains were permanently detached, and two had never served a day with the 7th since their appointment in July 1866. (Note: Capt. Sheridan (Company L), the brother of Lt. Gen. Philip H. Sheridan, served only seven months in 1866–67 before becoming permanent aide to his brother but remained on the rolls until 1882. Capt. Ilsley (Company E) was aide to Maj. Gen John Pope from 1866 to 1879, when he finally joined his command. Capt. Tourtelotte (Company G) never joined the 7th. A fourth captain, Owen Hale (Company K), was the regiment's recruiting officer in St. Louis and rejoined his company immediately.) Three second lieutenant vacancies (in E, H, and L Companies) were also unfilled.

==== Battle of the Rosebud ====
The Army's coordination and planning began to go awry on June 17, 1876 when Crook's column retreated after the Battle of the Rosebud, 30 miles (48 km) to the southeast of the eventual Little Bighorn battlefield. Surprised and according to some accounts astonished by the unusually large numbers of Native Americans, Crook held the field at the end of the battle but felt compelled by his losses to pull back, regroup, and wait for reinforcements. Unaware of Crook's battle, Gibbon and Terry proceeded, joining forces in early June near the mouth of Rosebud Creek. They reviewed Terry's plan calling for Custer's regiment to proceed south along the Rosebud while Terry and Gibbon's united forces would move in a westerly direction toward the Bighorn and Little Bighorn Rivers. As this was the likely location of Native encampments, all army elements had been instructed to converge there around June 26 or 27 in an attempt to engulf the Native Americans. On June 22, Terry ordered the 7th Cavalry, composed of 31 officers and 566 enlisted men under Custer, to begin a reconnaissance in force and pursuit along the Rosebud, with the prerogative to "depart" from orders if Custer saw "sufficient reason". Custer had been offered the use of Gatling guns but declined, believing they would slow his rate of march.

==== Little Bighorn ====
While the Terry–Gibbon column was marching toward the mouth of the Little Bighorn, on the evening of June 24, Custer's Indian scouts arrived at an overlook known as the Crow's Nest, 14 miles (23 km) east of the Little Bighorn River. At sunrise on June 25, Custer's scouts reported they could see a massive pony herd and signs of the Native American village (Note: Plains Indians were semi-nomadic peoples and had no permanent settlements off the reservations (aka "Agencies). A "village" was a collection of tipis, housing a group of Natives under the leadership of a chief, including those of tribes other than the chief's. A village would be created wherever a group stopped by simply erecting the tipis and could last from a single night to several weeks. Young warriors without a tipi would generally create lean-tos or sleep in the open. When the chief decided that it was time to move on the villagers simply struck their tipis, tied the tipi poles to their horses so as to form a travois for their goods and children, and followed the chief. The term "village", therefore, refers to the group while moving or encamped.) roughly 15 miles (24 km) in the distance. After a night's march, the tired officer who was sent with the scouts could see neither, and when Custer joined them, he was also unable to make the sighting. Custer's scouts also spotted the regimental cooking fires that could be seen from 10 mi (16 km) away, disclosing the regiment's position.

Custer contemplated a surprise attack against the encampment the following morning of June 26, but he then received a report informing him several "hostiles" [sic] had discovered the trail left by his troops. Assuming his presence had been exposed, Custer decided to attack the village without further delay. On the morning of June 25, Custer divided his 12 troops into three squadrons in anticipation of the forthcoming engagement. Three troops were placed under the command of Major Marcus Reno (A, G, and M) and three were placed under the command of Captain Frederick Benteen (H, D, and K). Five troops (C, E, F, I, and L) remained under Custer's immediate command. The 12th, B troop under Captain Thomas McDougall, had been assigned to escort the slower pack train carrying provisions and additional ammunition.

Unknown to Custer, the group of Native Americans seen on his trail was actually leaving the encampment and did not alert the rest of the village. Custer's scouts warned him about the size of the village, with Mitch Bouyer reportedly saying, "General, I have been with these Indians for 30 years, and this is the largest village I have ever heard of." (Note: Villages were usually arrayed in U-shaped semi-circles open to the east; in multi-tribal villages, each tribe would erect their tipis in this manner separately from the other tribes but close to the other tribes. Sitting Bull's village was multi-tribal, consisted of "a thousand tipis [that] were assembled in six horseshoe-shaped semicircles", had a population of approx. 8000 people, and stretched over two miles end-to-end.) Custer's overriding concern was that the Native American group would break up and scatter. The command began its approach to the village at noon and prepared to attack in full daylight.

With an impending sense of doom, the Crow scout Half Yellow Face prophetically warned Custer (speaking through the interpreter Mitch Bouyer), "You and I are going home today by a road we do not know."

== Prelude ==
=== Military assumptions prior to the battle ===
==== Number of Indian warriors ====
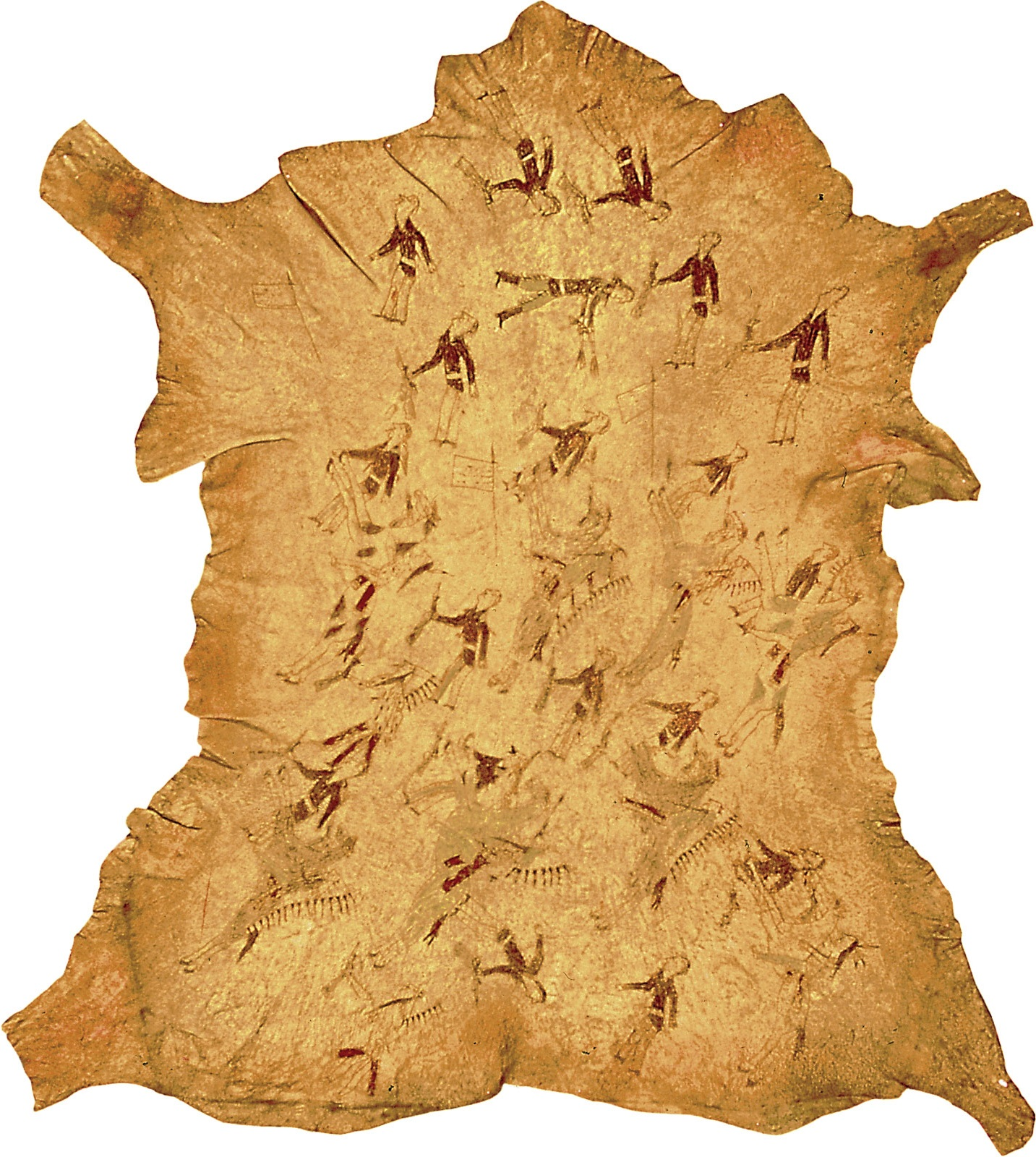
A Cheyenne artist's depiction of the Battle of the Little Bighorn

As the Army moved into the field on its expedition, it was operating with incorrect assumptions as to the number of Indians it would encounter. These assumptions were based on inaccurate information provided by the Indian Agents that no more than 800 "hostiles" were in the area. The Indian Agents based this estimate on the number of Lakota that Sitting Bull and other leaders had reportedly led off the reservation in protest of U.S. government policies. It was in fact a correct estimate until several weeks before the battle when the "reservation Indians" joined Sitting Bull's ranks for the summer buffalo hunt. The agents did not consider the many thousands of these "reservation Indians" who had unofficially left the reservation to join their "uncooperative non-reservation cousins led by Sitting Bull". Thus, Custer unknowingly faced thousands of Indians, including the 800 non-reservation "hostiles". All Army plans were based on the incorrect numbers. Although Custer was criticized after the battle for not having accepted reinforcements and for dividing his forces, it appears that he had accepted the same official government estimates of hostiles in the area which Terry and Gibbon had also accepted. Historian James Donovan notes, however, that when Custer later asked interpreter Fred Gerard for his opinion on the size of the opposition, he estimated the force at 1,100 warriors.

Additionally, Custer was more concerned with preventing the escape of the Lakota and Cheyenne than with fighting them, as reported by John Martin (born in Italy as Giovanni Martino).

Martin was temporarily assigned to serve as one of Custer's trumpeter-orderlies. As Custer and nearly 210 troopers and scouts began their final approach to the massive Indian village located in the Little Bighorn River Valley, Martin was dispatched with an urgent note for reinforcements and ammunition. Newspaper accounts of the period referred to him as "Custer massacre survivor" and "the last white man to see Custer alive".

From his observation, Custer assumed the warriors had been sleeping in on the morning of the battle, to which virtually every native account attested later, giving Custer a false estimate of what he was up against. When he and his scouts first looked down on the village from the Crow's Nest across the Little Bighorn River, they could see only the herd of ponies. Later, looking from a hill 2 1/2 miles (4 km) away after parting with Reno's command, Custer could observe only women preparing for the day, and young boys taking thousands of horses out to graze south of the village. Custer's Crow scouts told him it was the largest native village they had ever seen. When the scouts began changing back into their native dress right before the battle, Custer released them from his command. While the village was enormous, Custer still thought there were far fewer warriors to defend the village.

Finally, Custer may have assumed when he encountered the Native Americans that his subordinate Benteen, who was with the pack train, would provide support. In a subsequent official 1879 Army investigation requested by Major Reno, the Reno Board of Inquiry (RCOI), Benteen and Reno's men testified that they heard distinct rifle volleys as late as 4:30 pm during the battle.

Custer had initially wanted to take a day to scout the village before attacking; however, when men who went back looking for supplies accidentally dropped by the pack train, they discovered that their track had already been discovered by Indians. Reports from his scouts also revealed fresh pony tracks from ridges overlooking his formation. It became apparent that the warriors in the village were either aware or would soon be aware of his approach. Fearing that the village would break up into small bands that he would have to chase, Custer began to prepare for an immediate attack.

==== Role of Indian noncombatants in Custer's strategy ====
Custer's field strategy was designed to engage non-combatants at the encampments on the Little Bighorn to capture women, children, and the elderly or disabled to serve as hostages to convince the warriors to surrender and comply with federal orders to relocate. Custer's battalions were poised to "ride into the camp and secure non-combatant hostages", and "forc[e] the warriors to surrender". Author Evan S. Connell observed that if Custer could occupy the village before widespread resistance developed, the Sioux and Cheyenne warriors "would be obliged to surrender, because if they started to fight, they would be endangering their families."

In Custer's book My Life on the Plains, published two years before the Battle of the Little Bighorn, he asserted:

Indians contemplating a battle, either offensive or defensive, are always anxious to have their women and children removed from all danger ... For this reason I decided to locate our [military] camp as close as convenient to [Chief Black Kettle's Cheyenne] village, knowing that the close proximity of their women and children, and their necessary exposure in case of conflict, would operate as a powerful argument in favor of peace, when the question of peace or war came to be discussed.

On Custer's decision to advance up the bluffs and descend on the village from the east, Lt. Edward Godfrey of Company K surmised:

[Custer] expected to find the squaws and children fleeing to the bluffs on the north, for in no other way do I account for his wide detour. He must have counted upon Reno's success, and fully expected the "scatteration" of the non-combatants with the pony herds. The probable attack upon the families and capture of the herds were in that event counted upon to strike consternation in the hearts of the warriors and were elements for success upon which General Custer fully counted.

The Sioux and Cheyenne fighters were acutely aware of the danger posed by the military engagement of non-combatants and that "even a semblance of an attack on the women and children" would draw the warriors back to the village, according to historian John S. Gray. Such was their concern that an apparent reconnaissance by Capt. Yates' E and F Companies at the mouth of Medicine Tail Coulee (Minneconjou Ford) caused hundreds of warriors to disengage from the Reno valley fight and return to deal with the threat to the village.

Based on archaeological evidence and reviews of native testimony, some authors and historians speculate that Custer attempted to cross the river at a point farther north that they refer to as Ford D. According to Richard A. Fox, James Donovan, and others, Custer proceeded with a wing of his battalion (Yates' E and F companies) north and opposite the Cheyenne circle at that crossing, which provided "access to the [women and children] fugitives." Yates's force "posed an immediate threat to fugitive Indian families..." gathering at the north end of the huge encampment; he then persisted in his efforts to "seize women and children" even as hundreds of warriors were massing around Keogh's wing on the bluffs. Yates' wing, descending to the Little Bighorn River at Ford D, encountered "light resistance", undetected by the Indian forces ascending the bluffs east of the village. Custer was almost within "striking distance of the refugees" before abandoning the ford and returning to Custer Ridge.

=== Lone Teepee ===
The Lone Teepee (or Tipi) was a landmark along the 7th Cavalry's march. It was where the Indian encampment had been a week earlier during the Battle of the Rosebud on June 17, 1876. The Indians had left a single teepee standing (some reports mention a second that had been partially dismantled), and in it was the body of a Sans Arc warrior, Old She-Bear, who had been wounded in the battle. He had died after the Rosebud battle, and it was the custom of the Indians to move camp when a warrior died and leave possessions with the body. The Lone Teepee was an important location during the Battle of the Little Bighorn for several reasons, including:

- It is where Custer gave Reno his final orders to attack the village ahead. It is also where some Indians who had been following the command were seen and Custer assumed he had been discovered.
- Many of the survivors' accounts use the Lone Teepee as a point of reference for event times or distances.
- Knowing this location helps establish the pattern of the Indians' movements to the encampment on the river where the soldiers found them.

== Battle ==
=== Reno's attack ===
Movements of the 7th Cavalry A: Custer B: Reno C: Benteen D: Yates E: Weir

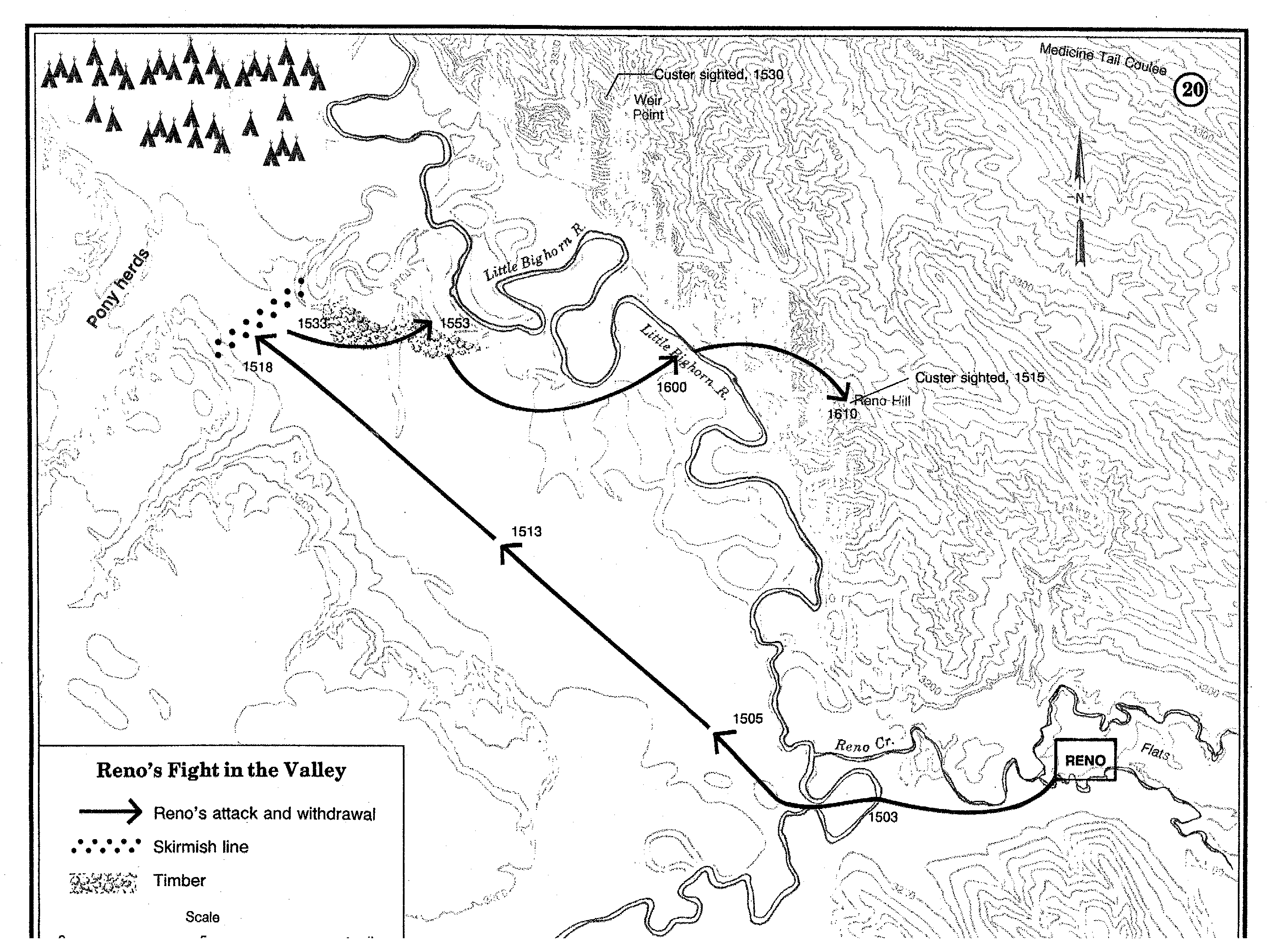
Movement of Major Reno's three companies

The first group to attack was Major Reno's second detachment (troops A, G, and M) after receiving orders from Custer written out by Lt. William W. Cooke, as Custer's Crow scouts reported Sioux tribe members were alerting the village. Ordered to charge, Reno began that phase of the battle. The orders, made without accurate knowledge of the village's size, location, or the warriors' propensity to stand and fight, had been to pursue the Native Americans and "bring them to battle." Reno's force crossed the Little Bighorn at the mouth of what is today Reno Creek around 3:10 pm on June 25. They immediately realized that the Lakota and Northern Cheyenne were present "in force and not running away."

Reno advanced rapidly across the open field towards the northwest, his movements masked by the thick belt of trees that ran along the southern banks of the Little Bighorn River. The same trees on his front right shielded his movements across the wide field over which his men rapidly rode, first with two approximately forty-man companies abreast and eventually with all three charging abreast. The trees also obscured Reno's view of the Native American village until his force had passed that bend on his right front and was suddenly within arrow-shot of the village. The tepees in that area were occupied by the Hunkpapa Sioux. Neither Custer nor Reno had much idea of the length, depth and size of the encampment they were attacking, as the village was hidden by the trees. When Reno came into the open in front of the south end of the village, he sent his Arikara/Ree and Crow Indian scouts forward on his exposed left flank. Realizing the full extent of the village's width, Reno quickly suspected what he would later call "a trap" and stopped a few hundred yards short of the encampment.

He ordered his troopers to dismount and deploy in a skirmish line, according to standard army doctrine. In this formation, every fourth trooper held the horses for the troopers in firing position, with 5 to 10 yards (5 to 9 m) separating each trooper, officers to their rear and troopers with horses behind the officers. This formation reduced Reno's firepower by 25 per cent. As Reno's men fired an enfilade onto the village, and by some accounts killed several wives and children of the Sioux chief Gall (in Lakota, Phizí), the mounted warriors began streaming out to meet the attack. With Reno's men anchored on their right by the protection of the tree line and bend in the river, the Indians rode against the center and exposed left end of Reno's line. After about 20 minutes of long-distance firing, Reno had taken only one casualty, but the odds against him had risen (Reno estimated five to one), and Custer had not reinforced him. Trooper Billy Jackson reported that by then, the Indians had begun massing in the open area shielded by a small hill to the left of Reno's line and to the right of the Indian village. From this position the Indians mounted an attack of more than 500 warriors against the left and rear of Reno's line, turning Reno's exposed left flank. This forced a hasty withdrawal into the timber along the bend in the river. Here the Native Americans pinned Reno and his men down and tried to set fire to the brush to try to drive the soldiers out of their position.

Reno's Arikara scout Bloody Knife was shot in the head, splattering brains and blood onto Reno's face. The shaken Reno ordered his men to dismount and mount again. He then said, "All those who wish to make their escape follow me." Abandoning the wounded, he led a disorderly rout for a mile next to the river. He made no attempt to engage the Indians to prevent them from picking off men in the rear. The retreat was immediately disrupted by Cheyenne attacks at close quarters. A steep bank some 8 feet (2.4 m) high awaited the mounted men as they crossed the river; some horses fell back onto others below them. Indians fired on the soldiers from a distance, and within close quarters pulled them off their horses and clubbed their heads. Later, Reno reported that three officers and 29 troopers had been killed during the retreat and subsequent fording of the river. Another officer and 13–18 men were missing. Most of these missing men were left behind in the timber, although many eventually rejoined the detachment.

==== Reno and Benteen on Reno Hill ====
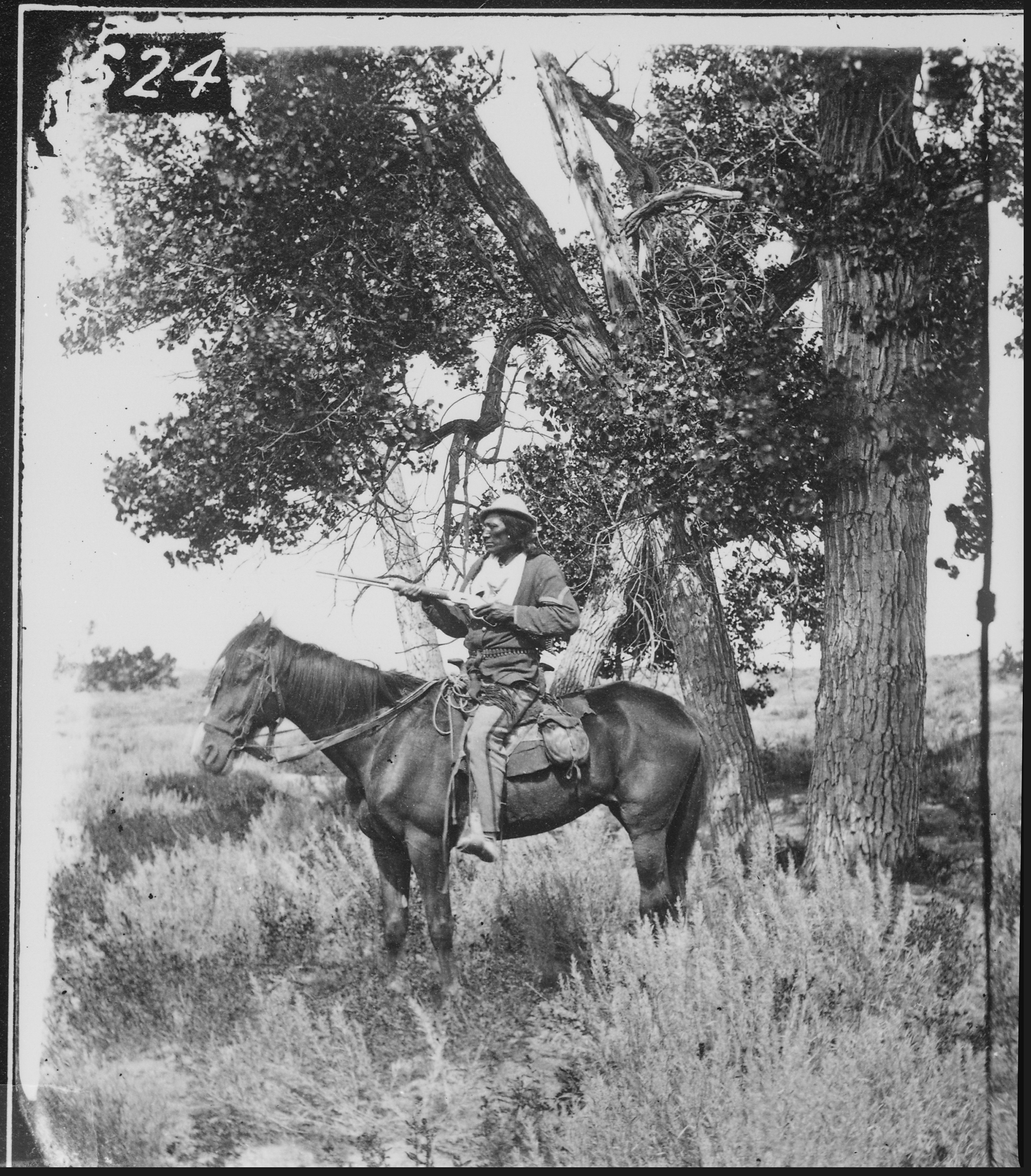
Bloody Knife, a scout in the American army

Atop the bluffs near what is known today as Reno Hill, Reno's depleted and shaken troops were joined by Captain Benteen's column while Reno's men were still retreating up from the valley. (troops D, H, and K), arriving from the south. This force had been returning from a lateral scouting mission when it had been summoned by Custer's messenger, Italian immigrant bugler John Martin (Giovanni Martino) with the handwritten message: "Benteen. Come on, Big Village, Be quick, Bring packs. P.S. Bring Packs." This message made no sense to Benteen, as his men would be needed more in a fight than the packs carried by herd animals. Though both men inferred that Custer was engaged in battle, Reno refused to move until the packs arrived so his men could resupply. The detachments were later reinforced by McDougall's Company B and the pack train. The 14 officers and 340 troopers on the bluffs organized an all-around defense and dug rifle pits using whatever implements they had among them, including knives. This practice had become standard during the last year of the American Civil War, as Union and Confederate troops used knives, eating utensils, mess plates, and pans to dig effective battlefield fortifications.

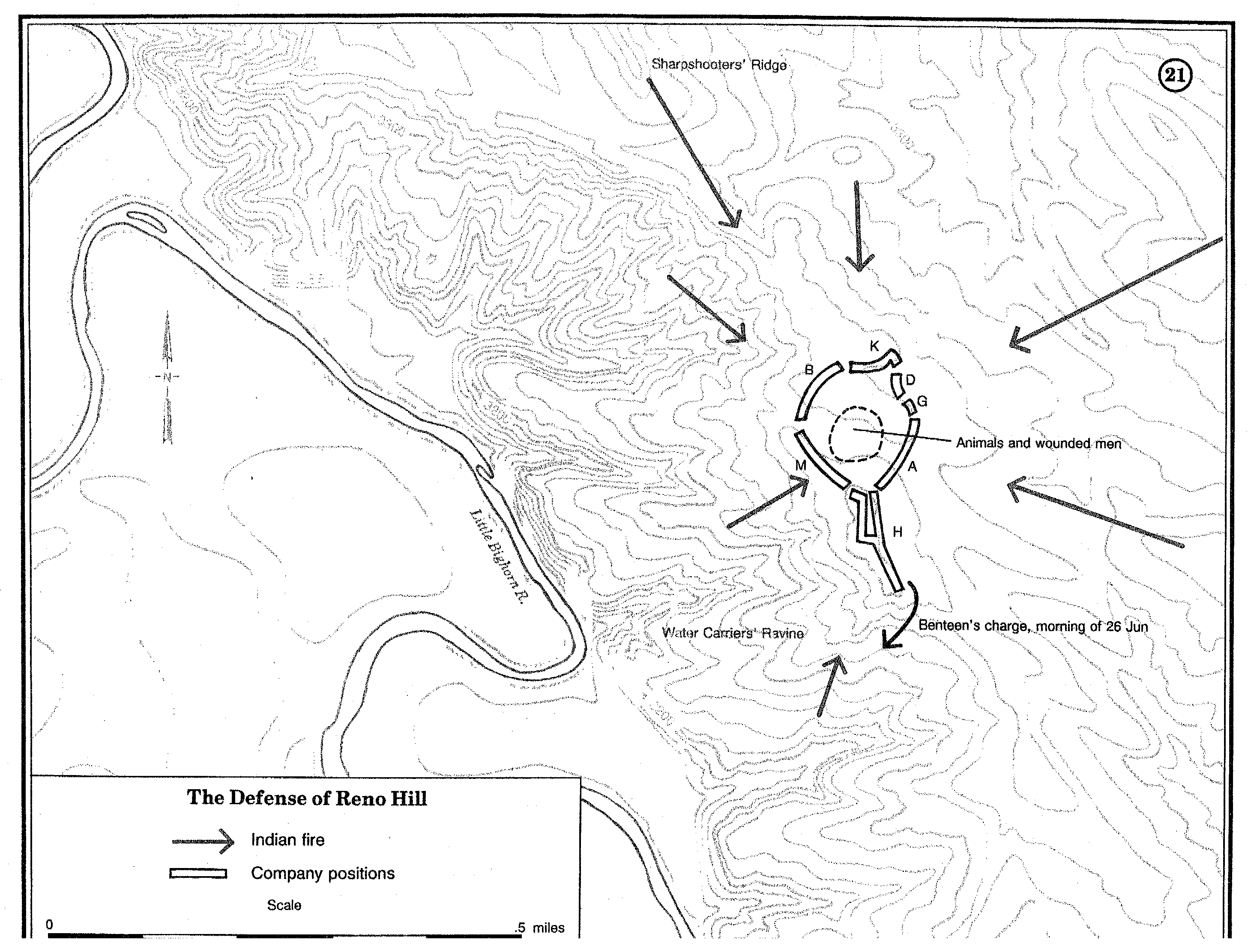
Reno–Benteen defensive position

Despite hearing heavy gunfire from the north, including distinct volleys at 4:20 pm, Benteen concentrated on reinforcing Reno's badly wounded and hard-pressed detachment rather than continuing on toward Custer's position. Benteen's apparent reluctance to reach Custer prompted later criticism that he had failed to follow orders. Around 5:00 pm, Capt. Thomas Weir and Company D moved out to contact Custer. Capt. Weir remained on the bluffs, while D moved to the right down Cedar Coulee (RCOI figure 8), but they soon looped back around to the bluffs. Lt Luther Rector Hare, sent by Reno to Weir, and troops M, K and H also had moved north from the Reno retreat area. D, M and K advanced a mile to what is today Weir Peaks or Weir Point, and dismounted. From his vantage point on the bluffs, Weir could see that the Indian camps comprised some 1,800 lodges. Behind them he saw through the dust and smoke hills that were oddly red in color; he later learned that this was a massive assemblage of Indian ponies. By this time, roughly 5:25 pm, Custer's battle may have concluded. From high ground at Weir Peaks, looking though his spyglass, Weir witnessed many Indian hostiles on horseback and on foot wondering around in the distance and shooting at objects on the ground, perhaps killing wounded soldiers and firing at dead bodies on the "Last Stand Hill" at the northern end of the Custer battlefield. Realizing these were Indian hostiles, the three troops remained on the peaks and the hill to the east. Some historians have suggested that what Weir witnessed was the tail-end of a fight on what is now called Calhoun Hill some minutes earlier. The destruction of Keogh's battalion may have begun with the collapse of L, I, and C troops (half of it) following the combined assaults led by Crazy Horse, White Bull, Hump, Gall, and others. Other native accounts contradict this understanding, however, and the time element remains a subject of debate. The other companies had eventually left the area near Reno Hill and followed Weir by assigned battalions: first Benteen, then M troop, Reno's command, and the pack train and wounded. Strung along the bluffs behind D/M/K, Benteen and H soon returned to meet Reno's command at the high point called Capt. Weir's Hill (RCOI figure 7) and deployed along the ridge/bluffs there. Benteen informed Reno of their bad position. Weir also returned from the Peaks to the command at that location. The three troops (D, M, K) which had dismounted and remained at Weir Peaks (RCOI figure 9) were soon attacked by native hostiles, increasingly coming from the concluded Custer engagement. Following Benteen's advice, Reno via Hare ordered the withdrawal of the three advance troops, and all seven companies eventually fell back to Reno Hill before the pack train had moved even a quarter mile (400 m). Lt. Edward Settle Godfrey, Lt. Hare and troop K set up a skirmish line where Reno had retreated up from the valley, south of Weir's Hill, to halt the pursuing Indians, who took the surrounding high ground and hills. The companies remained pinned down on the bluff, fending off the Indians for three hours until night fell. The soldiers dug crude trenches as the Indians performed their war dance in the village.

Benteen was hit in the heel of his boot by an Indian bullet. At one point, he led a counterattack to push back Indians who had continued to crawl through the grass closer to the soldiers' positions.

=== Custer's fight ===
External videos
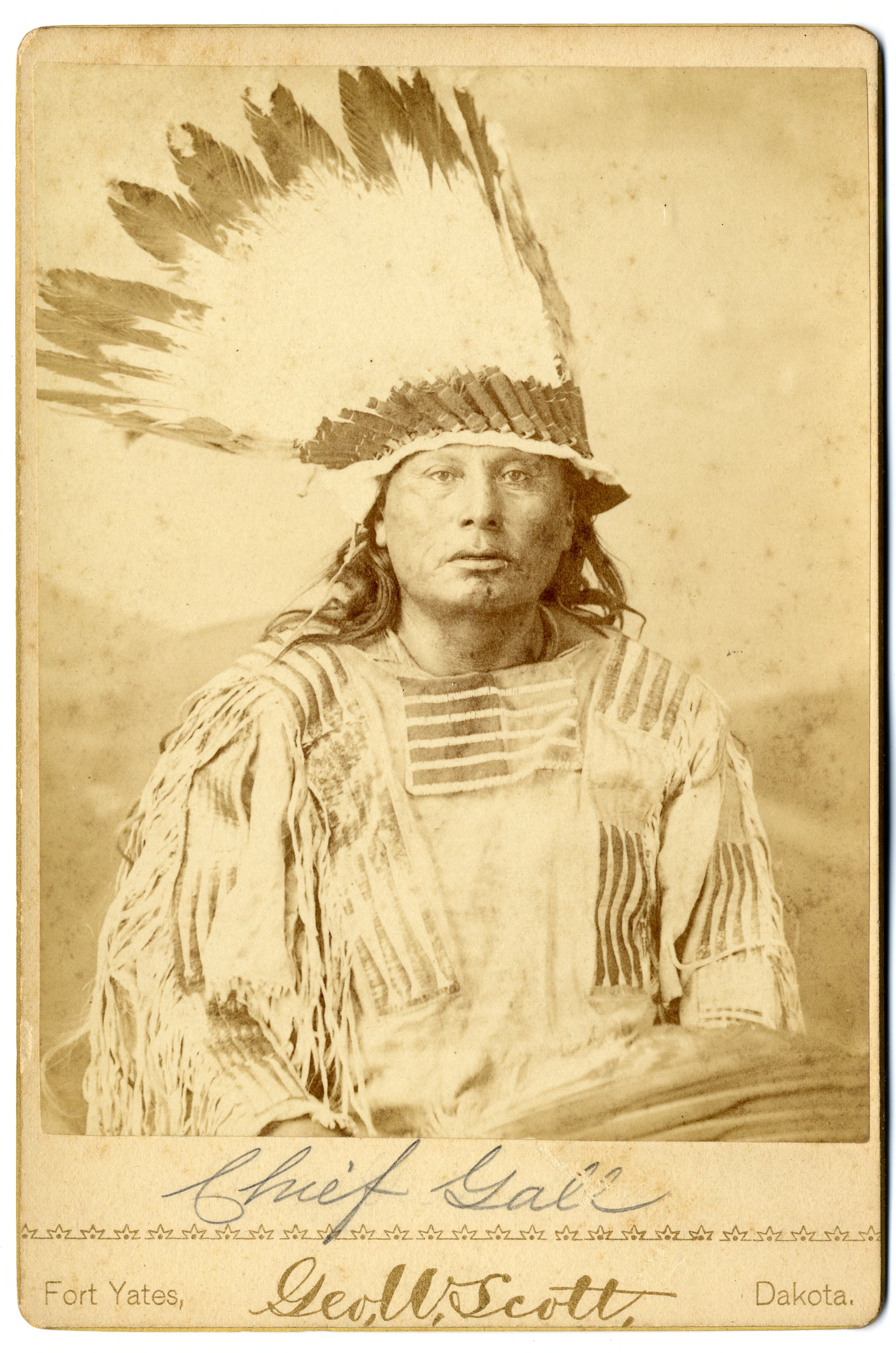
- Gall
- C-SPAN Cities Tour – Billings: Battle of the Little Bighorn, 38:44, C-SPAN Park Ranger Steve Adelson describes the battle on-site

The precise details of Custer's fight and his movements before and during the battle are largely conjectural since none of the men who went forward with Custer's battalion (the five companies under his immediate command) survived the battle. Later accounts from surviving Indians are useful but are sometimes conflicting and unclear. Edward Sylvester Ellis wrote,

One column of five hundred mounted soldiers arrived first under General Custer. They had no expectation of serious trouble, and Custer divided his band, planning to surround the Indians and so compel them to keep quiet. On approaching the Indian camp, Custer discovered to his surprise that it was very much larger than he had supposed. It contained several thousand Indians who had gathered from wide distances under control of a shrewd old brave called Sitting Bull. Custer encouraged his men to ride boldly forward among the Indians; but they were met by a sudden mad charge of the excited redskins, who rode in force upon Custer's little troop and swept right over it. Custer, fighting heroically, was the last of his little band to fall ; not one survived. When other troops of soldiers reached the spot, the Indians had already scattered. Nothing definite as to Custer's fate was known until years afterward, when a surviving Indian told the tale.

While the gunfire heard on the bluffs by Reno and Benteen's men during the afternoon of June 25 was probably from Custer's fight, the soldiers on Reno Hill were unaware of what had happened to Custer until General Terry's arrival two days later on June 27. They were reportedly stunned by the news. When the army examined the Custer battle site, soldiers could not determine fully what had transpired. Custer's force of roughly 210 men had been engaged by the Lakota and Northern Cheyenne about 3.5 miles (5.6 km) to the north of Reno and Benteen's defensive position. Evidence of organized resistance included an apparent skirmish line on Calhoun Hill and apparent breastworks made of dead horses on Custer Hill. By the time troops came to recover the bodies, the Lakota and Cheyenne had already removed most of their own dead from the field. The troops found most of Custer's dead men stripped of their clothing, ritually mutilated, and in a state of decomposition, making identification of many impossible. The soldiers identified the 7th Cavalry's dead as well as they could and hastily buried them where they had fallen.

Custer's body was found with two gunshot wounds, one to his left chest and the other to his left temple. Either wound would have been fatal, though he appeared to have bled from only the chest wound; some scholars believe his head wound may have been delivered postmortem. Some Lakota oral histories assert that Custer, having sustained a wound, committed suicide to avoid capture and subsequent torture. This would be inconsistent with his known right-handedness, but that does not rule out assisted suicide (other native accounts note several soldiers committing suicide near the end of the battle). Custer's body was found near the top of Custer Hill, which also came to be known as "Last Stand Hill". There the United States erected a tall memorial obelisk inscribed with the names of the 7th Cavalry's casualties.

Several days after the battle, Curley, Custer's Crow scout who had left Custer near Medicine Tail Coulee (a drainage which led to the river), recounted the battle, reporting that Custer had attacked the village after attempting to cross the river. He was driven back, retreating toward the hill where his body was found. As the scenario seemed compatible with Custer's aggressive style of warfare and with evidence found on the ground, it became the basis of many popular accounts of the battle.

According to Pretty Shield, the wife of Goes-Ahead (another Crow scout for the 7th Cavalry), Custer was killed while crossing the river: "... and he died there, died in the water of the Little Bighorn, with Two-bodies, and the blue soldier carrying his flag". In this account, Custer was allegedly killed by a Lakota called Big-nose. However, in Chief Gall's version of events, as recounted to Lt. Edward Settle Godfrey, Custer did not attempt to ford the river and the nearest that he came to the river or village was his final position on the ridge. Chief Gall's statements were corroborated by other Indians, notably the wife of Spotted Horn Bull. Given that no bodies of men or horses were found anywhere near the ford, Godfrey himself concluded "that Custer did not go to the ford with any body of men".

Cheyenne oral tradition credits Buffalo Calf Road Woman with striking the blow that knocked Custer off his horse before he died.

==== Custer at Minneconjou Ford ====
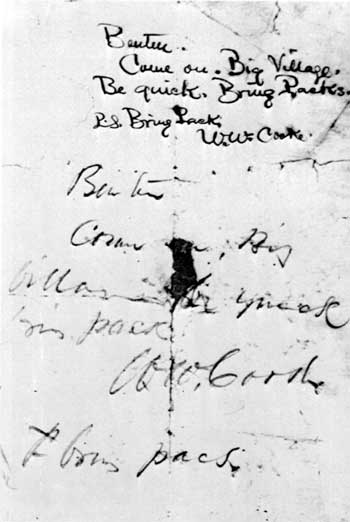
Lt. Adjutant William W. Cooke's message conveying Custer's orders to Frederick Benteen, June 25, 1876. Benteen's transcription is at upper right.

Hurrah boys, we've got them! We'll finish them up and then go home to our station.

— Reported words of Lieutenant Colonel Custer at the battle's outset.

Having isolated Reno's force and driven them away from their encampment, the bulk of the native warriors were free to pursue Custer. The route taken by Custer to his "Last Stand" remains a subject of some debate. One possibility is that after ordering Reno to charge, Custer continued down Reno Creek to within about a half-mile (800 m) of the Little Bighorn, but then turned north and followed a ridge towards the bluffs, reaching them near the same spot to which Reno would soon retreat. A half mile farther, he reached the high ground and ridge, near the high point called Weir's Hill (2500′ above Weir Peaks). From this high pinnacle where the bluff was tight to the river, he could see part of the big village in the valley on the other side. After passing over the high ridge (which connected Weir's Hill to Sharpshooter's Hill, sometimes referred to as "Martin's Ridge"), Custer and his troops descended Cedar Coulee (RCOI figure 8) and into Medicine Tail Coulee. Some historians believe that part of Custer's force descended the coulee, going west to the river and attempting unsuccessfully to cross into the village. According to some accounts, a small contingent of Indian sharpshooters effectively opposed this crossing.

White Cow Bull claimed to have shot a leader wearing a buckskin jacket off his horse in the river. While no other Indian account supports this claim, if White Bull did shoot a buckskin-clad leader off his horse, some historians have argued that Custer may have been seriously wounded by him. Some Indian accounts claim that besides wounding one of the leaders of this advance, a soldier carrying a company guidon was also hit. Troopers had to dismount to help the wounded men back onto their horses. The fact that either of the non-mutilation wounds to Custer's body (a bullet wound below the heart and a shot to the left temple) would have been instantly fatal casts doubt on his being wounded and remounted.

Reports of an attempted fording of the river at Medicine Tail Coulee might explain Custer's purpose for Reno's attack, that is, a coordinated "hammer-and-anvil" maneuver, with Reno's holding the Indians at bay at the southern end of the camp, while Custer drove them against Reno's line from the north. Other historians have noted that if Custer did attempt to cross the river near Medicine Tail Coulee, he may have believed it was the north end of the Indian camp, only to discover that it was the middle. Some Indian accounts, however, place the Northern Cheyenne encampment and the north end of the overall village to the left (and south) of the opposite side of the crossing. The precise location of the north end of the village remains in dispute, however.

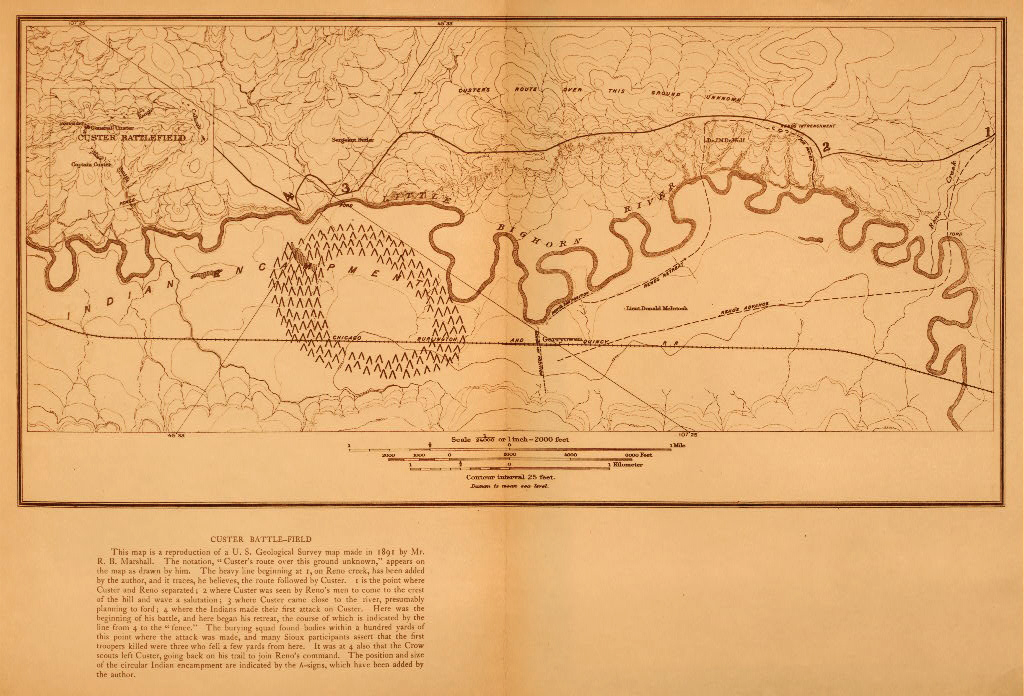
Custer's route over battlefield, as theorized by Curtis. (Credit: Northwestern University Library Edward S. Curtis's The North American Indian, 2003).

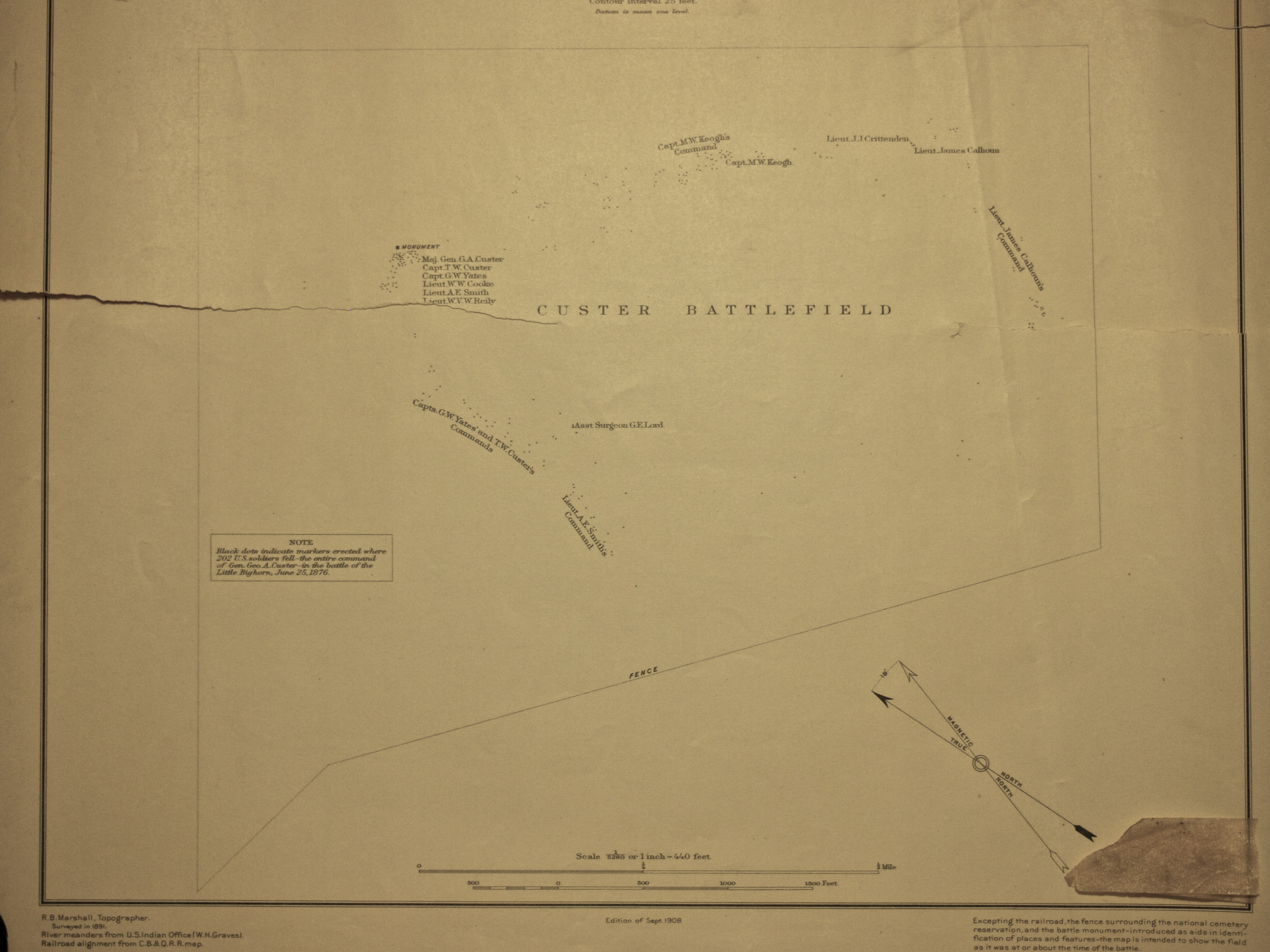
1:5260 of Custer battlefield – surveyed 1891, detailing U.S. soldiers' body locations

In 1908, Edward Curtis, the famed ethnologist and photographer of the Native American Indians, made a detailed personal study of the battle, interviewing many of those who had fought or taken part in it. First, he went over the ground covered by the troops with the three Crow scouts White Man Runs Him, Goes Ahead, and Hairy Moccasin, and then again with Two Moons and a party of Cheyenne warriors. He also visited the Lakota country and interviewed Red Hawk, "whose recollection of the fight seemed to be particularly clear". Then, he went over the battlefield once more with the three Crow scouts, but also accompanied by General Charles Woodruff "as I particularly desired that the testimony of these men might be considered by an experienced army officer". Finally, Curtis visited the country of the Arikara and interviewed the scouts of that tribe who had been with Custer's command. Based on all the information he gathered, Curtis concluded that Custer had indeed ridden down the Medicine Tail Coulee and then towards the river where he probably planned to ford it. However, "the Indians had now discovered him and were gathered closely on the opposite side". They were soon joined by a large force of Sioux who (no longer engaging Reno) rushed down the valley. This was the beginning of their attack on Custer, who was forced to turn and head for the hill where he would make his famous "last stand". Thus, wrote Curtis, "Custer made no attack, the whole movement being a retreat".

==== Other views of Custer's actions at Minneconjou Ford ====
Other historians claim, from testimony of Lt. Edward Settle Godfrey, that Custer never approached the river, but rather continued north across the coulee and up the other side, where he gradually came under attack. According to this theory, by the time Custer realized he was badly outnumbered, it was too late to retreat to the south where Reno and Benteen could have provided assistance. Two men from the 7th Cavalry, the young Crow scout Ashishishe (known in English as Curley) and the trooper Peter Thompson, claimed to have seen Custer engage the Indians. The accuracy of their recollections remains controversial; accounts by battle participants and assessments by historians almost universally discredit Thompson's claim.

Archaeological evidence and reassessment of Indian testimony have led to a new interpretation of the battle. In the 1920s, battlefield investigators discovered hundreds of .45-70 shell cases along the ridge line known today as Nye-Cartwright Ridge, between South Medicine Tail Coulee and the next drainage at North Medicine Tail (also known as Deep Coulee). Some historians believe Custer divided his detachment into two (and possibly three) battalions, retaining personal command of one while presumably delegating Captain George W. Yates to command the second.

Evidence from the 1920s supports the theory that at least one of the companies made a feint attack southwest from Nye-Cartwright Ridge straight down the center of the "V" formed by the intersection at the crossing of Medicine Tail Coulee on the right and Calhoun Coulee on the left. The intent may have been to relieve pressure on Reno's detachment (according to the Crow scout Curley, possibly viewed by both Mitch Bouyer and Custer) by withdrawing the skirmish line into the timber near the Little Bighorn River. Had the U.S. troops come straight down Medicine Tail Coulee, their approach to the Minneconjou Crossing and the northern area of the village would have been masked by the high ridges running on the northwest side of the Little Bighorn River.

That they might have come southwest, from the center of Nye-Cartwright Ridge, seems to be supported by Northern Cheyenne accounts of seeing the approach of the distinctly white-colored horses of Company E, known as the Grey Horse Company. Its approach was seen by Indians at that end of the village. Behind them, a second company, further up on the heights, would have provided long-range cover fire. Warriors could have been drawn to the feint attack, forcing the battalion back towards the heights, up the north fork drainage, away from the troops providing cover fire above. The covering company would have moved towards a reunion, delivering heavy volley fire and leaving the trail of expended cartridges discovered 50 years later.

=== Last stand ===
In the end, the hilltop to which Custer had moved was probably too small to accommodate all of the survivors and wounded. Fire from the southeast made it impossible for Custer's men to secure a defensive position all around Last Stand Hill where the soldiers put up their most dogged defense. According to Lakota accounts, far more of their casualties occurred in the attack on Last Stand Hill than anywhere else. The extent of the soldiers' resistance indicated they had few doubts about their prospects for survival. According to Cheyenne and Sioux testimony, the command structure rapidly broke down, although smaller "last stands" were apparently made by several groups. Custer's remaining troops (E, F, and half of C) were soon killed.

By almost all accounts, the Lakota annihilated Custer's force within an hour of engagement. David Humphreys Miller, who between 1935 and 1955 interviewed the last Lakota survivors of the battle, wrote that the Custer fight lasted less than one-half hour. Other native accounts said the fighting lasted only "as long as it takes a hungry man to eat a meal." The Lakota asserted that Crazy Horse personally led one of the large groups of warriors who overwhelmed the cavalrymen in a surprise charge from the northeast, causing a breakdown in the command structure and panic among the troops. Many of these men threw down their weapons while Cheyenne and Sioux warriors rode them down, "counting coup" with lances, coup sticks, and quirts. Some Native accounts recalled this segment of the fight as a "buffalo run."

Captain Frederick Benteen, battalion leader of Companies D, H and K, on the 18th day of the Reno Court of Inquiry gave his observations on the Custer battlefield on June 27, 1876:

I went over the battlefield carefully with a view to determine how the battle was fought. I arrived at the conclusion then, as I have now, that it was a rout, a panic, until the last man was killed ...

That there was no line formed on the battlefield. You can take a handful of corn and scatter it over the floor, and make just such lines, there were none. The only approach to a line was where 5 or 6 [dead] horses found at equal distances, like skirmishers [part of Lt. Calhoun's Company L]. Ahead of those 5 or 6 [dead] horses there were 5 or 6 men at about the same distances, showing that the horses were killed and the riders jumped off and were all heading to get where General Custer was. That was the only approach to a line on the field. There were more than 20 [troopers] killed there to the right. There were 4 or 5 at one place, all within a space of 20 to 30 yards. That was the condition all over the field and in the [gorge].

I think, in all probability, that the men turned their horses loose without any orders to do so. Many orders might have been given, but few obeyed. I think that they were panic stricken; it was a rout, as I said before.

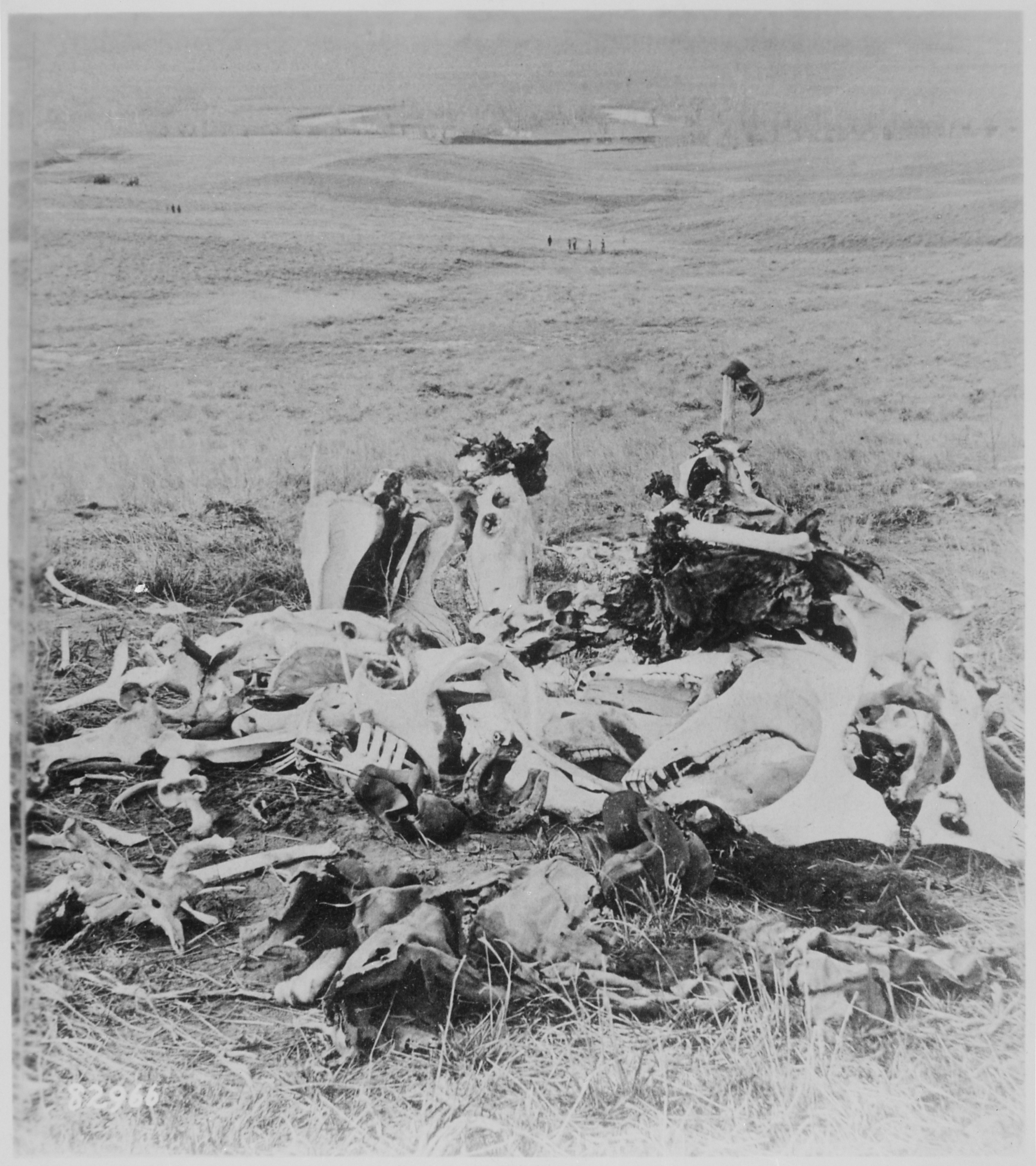
Looking in the direction of the Indian village and the deep ravine. Photo by Stanley J. Morrow, spring 1877

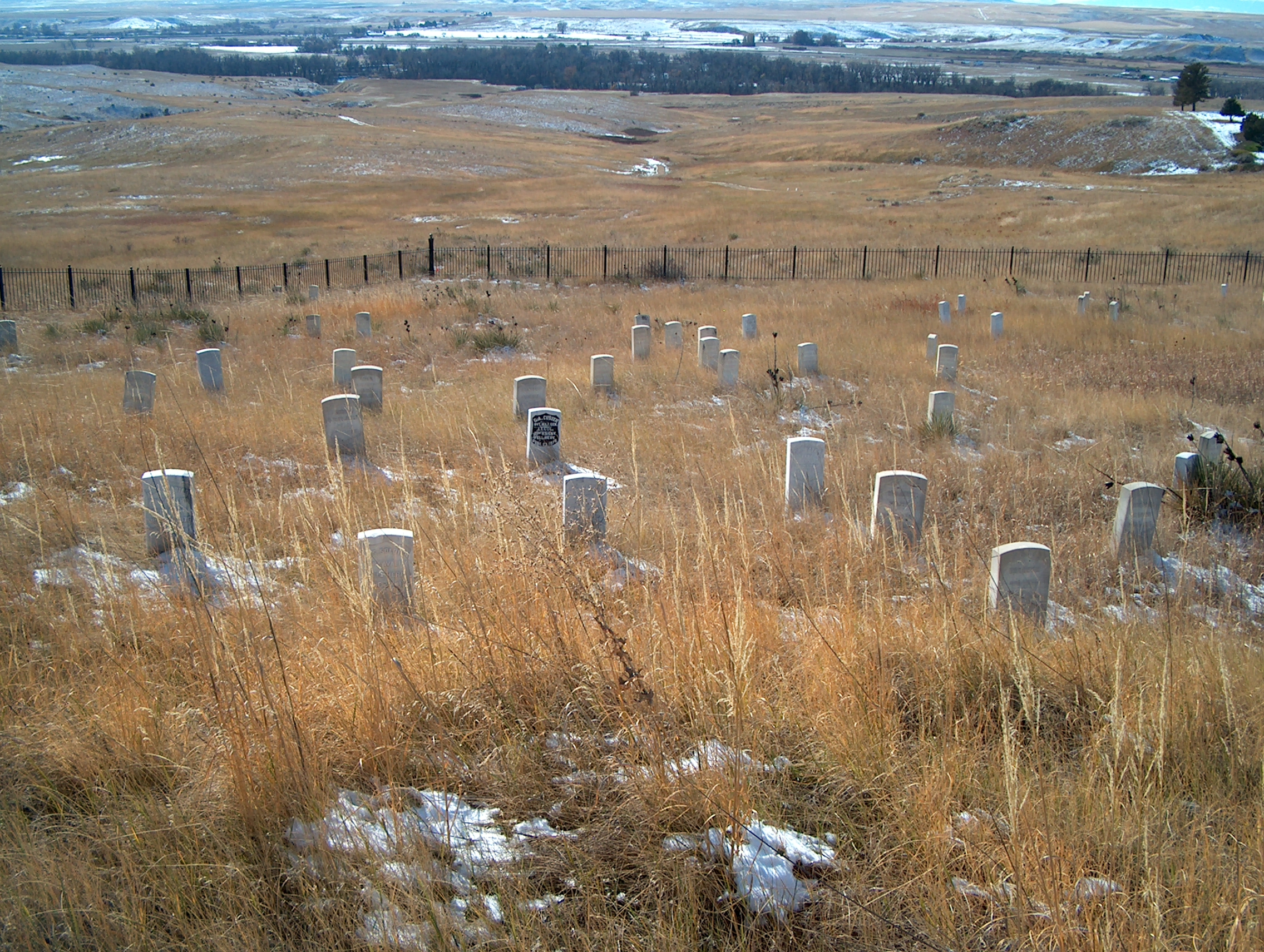
Looking in the direction of the Indian village and the deep ravine. Taken November 2011

A Brulé Sioux warrior stated: "In fact, Hollow Horn Bear believed that the troops were in good order at the start of the fight, and kept their organization even while moving from point to point." Red Horse, an Oglala Sioux warrior, commented: "Here [Last Stand Hill] the soldiers made a desperate fight." One Hunkpapa Sioux warrior, Moving Robe, noted that "It was a hotly contested battle", while another, Iron Hawk, stated: "The Indians pressed and crowded right in around Custer Hill. But the soldiers weren't ready to die. We stood there a long time." In a letter from February 21, 1910, Private William Taylor, Company M, 7th Cavalry, wrote: "Reno proved incompetent and Benteen showed his indifference—I will not use the uglier words that have often been in my mind. Both failed Custer and he had to fight it out alone."

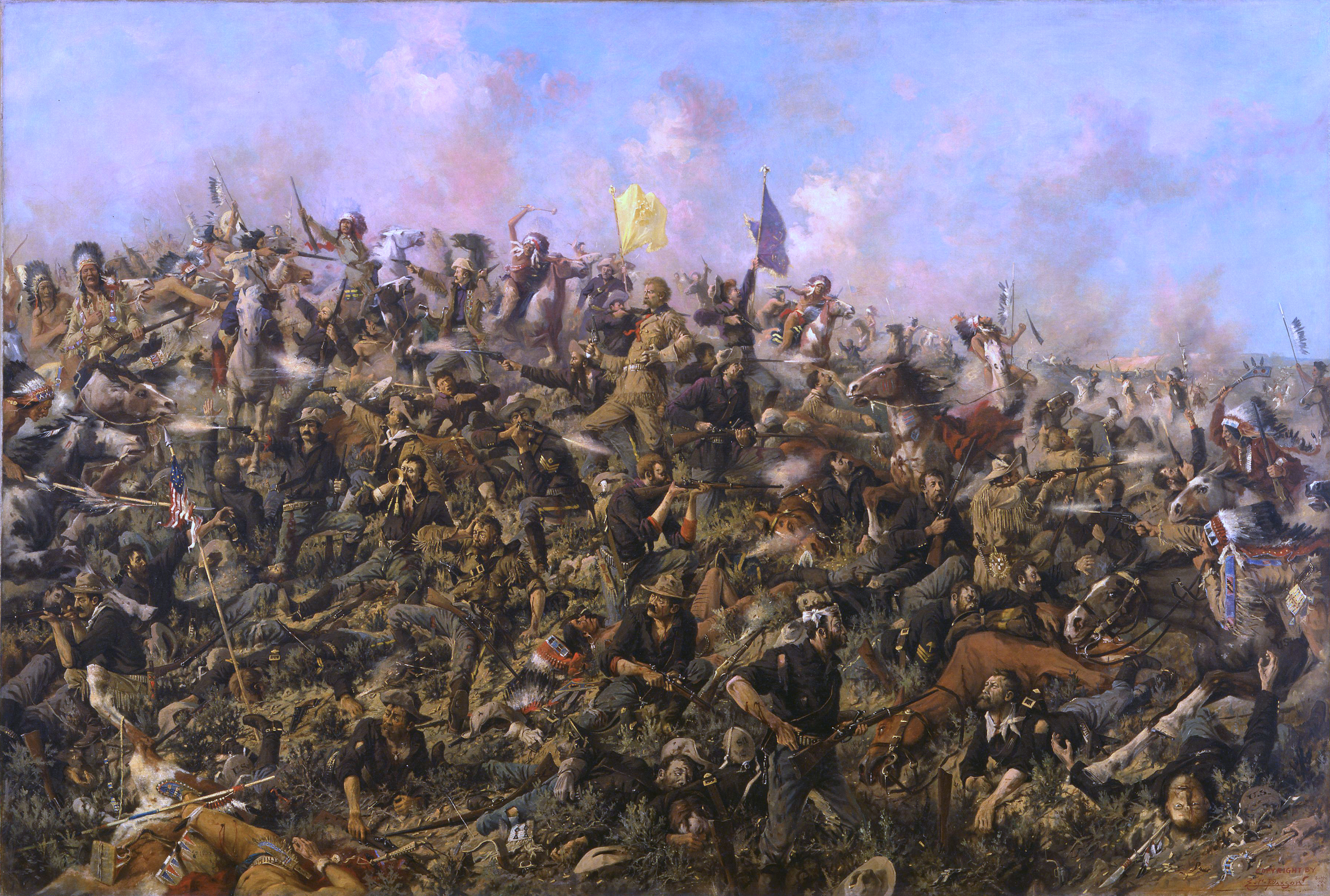
Custer's Last Stand by Edgar Samuel Paxson

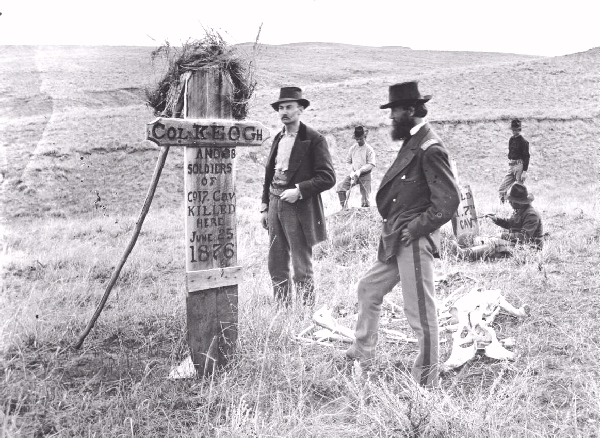
Keogh Battlefield Marker 1879

==== Custer's final resistance ====
Recent archaeological work at the battlefield indicates that officers on Custer Hill restored some tactical control. E Company rushed off Custer Hill toward the Little Bighorn River but failed to reach it, which resulted in the destruction of that company. This left about 50–60 men, mostly from F Company and the staff, on Last Stand Hill. The remainder of the battle took on the nature of a running fight. Modern archaeology and historical Indian accounts indicate that Custer's force may have been divided into three groups, with the Indians attempting to prevent them from effectively reuniting. Indian accounts describe warriors (including women) running up from the village to wave blankets in order to scare off the soldiers' horses. One 7th Cavalry trooper claimed to have found several stone mallets consisting of a round cobble weighing 8–10 pounds (about 4 kg) with a rawhide handle, which he believed had been used by the Indian women to finish off the wounded. Fighting dismounted, the soldiers' skirmish lines were overwhelmed. Army doctrine would have called for one man in four to be a horseholder behind the skirmish lines and, in extreme cases, one man in eight. Later, the troops would have bunched together in defensive positions and are alleged to have shot their remaining horses as cover. As individual troopers were wounded or killed, initial defensive positions would have been abandoned as untenable.

Under threat of attack, the first U.S. soldiers on the battlefield three days later hurriedly buried the troopers in shallow graves, more or less where they had fallen. A couple of years after the battle, markers were placed where men were believed to have fallen, so the placement of troops has been roughly construed. The troops evidently died in several groups, including on Custer Hill, around Captain Myles Keogh, and strung out towards the Little Bighorn River.

==== Last break-out attempt ====
According to Indian accounts, about forty men on Custer Hill made a desperate stand around Custer, delivering volley fire. The great majority of the Indian casualties were probably suffered during this closing segment of the battle, as the soldiers and Indians on Calhoun Ridge were more widely separated and traded fire at greater distances for most of their portion of the battle than did the soldiers and Indians on Custer Hill.

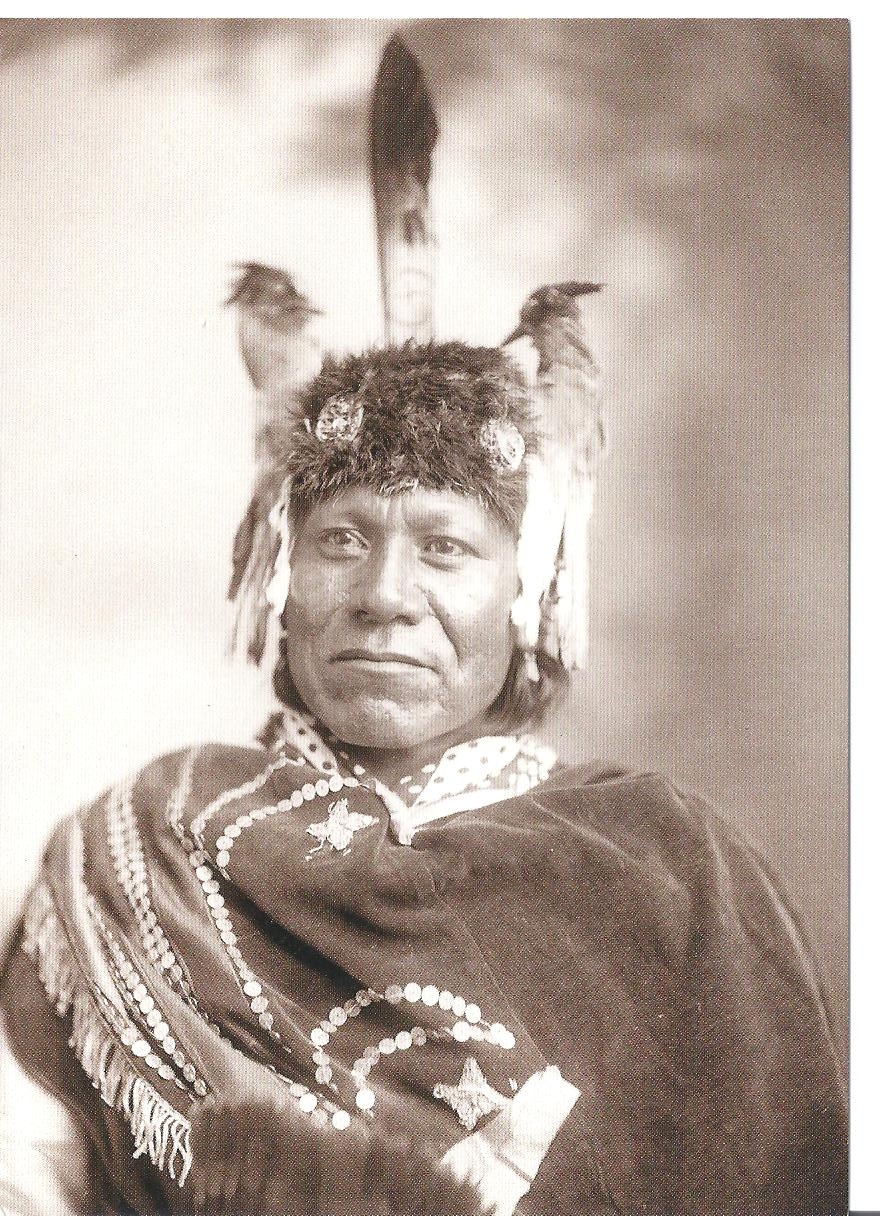
This c. 1895–1899 portrait of A-ca-po-re, a Ute musician, by Charles A. Nast has been misidentified as Mitch Bouyer for nearly 100 years.

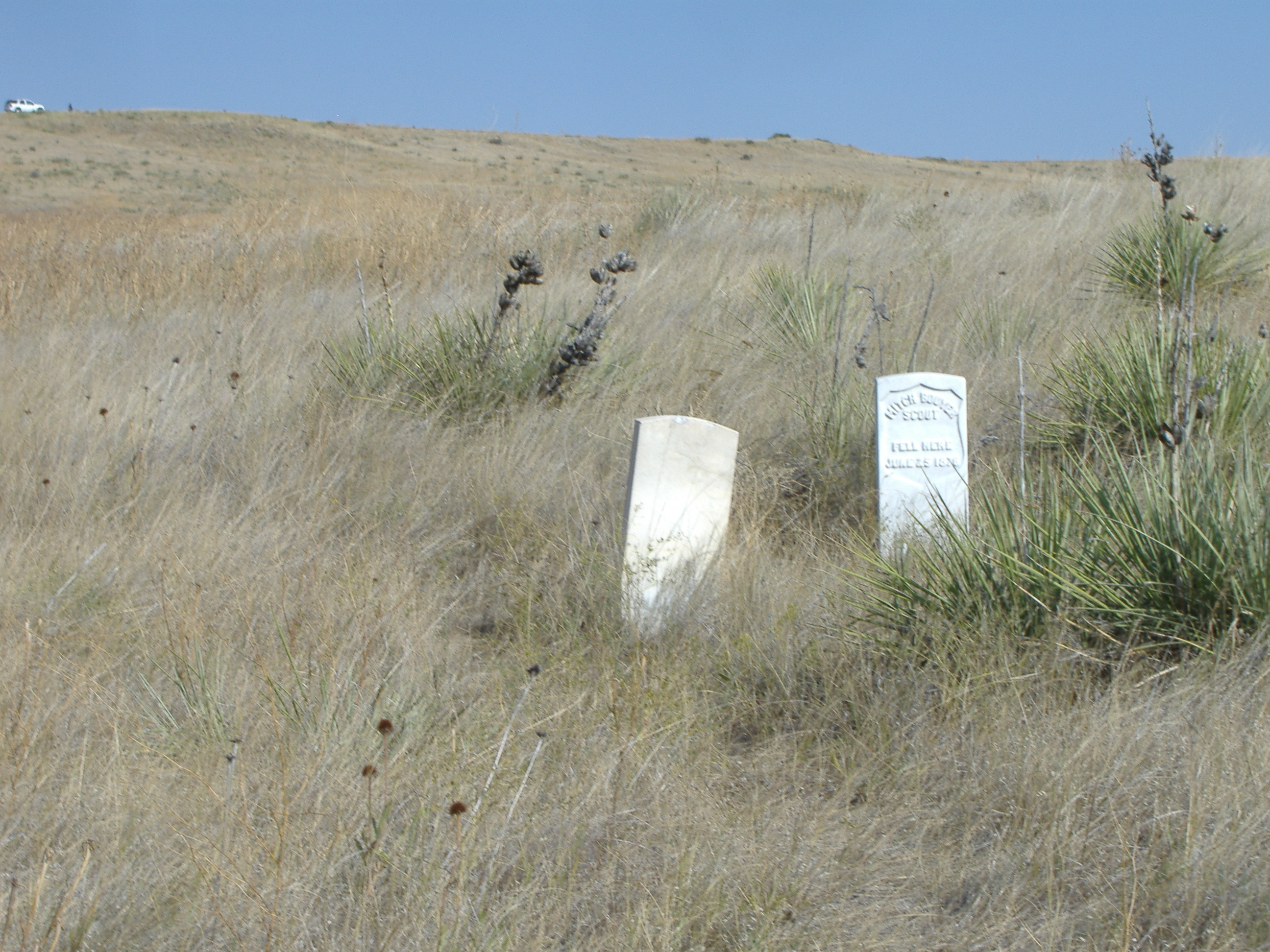
Mitch Bouyer marker on Deep Ravine trail. Deep Ravine is to the right of this picture (south/southwest) and about 65 yards (60 m) distant.

Modern documentaries suggest that there may not have been a "Last Stand", as traditionally portrayed in popular culture. Instead, archaeologists suggest that in the end, Custer's troops were not surrounded but rather overwhelmed by a single charge. This scenario corresponds to several Indian accounts stating Crazy Horse's charge swarmed the resistance, with the surviving soldiers fleeing in panic. (Note: Testimony of Yellow Nose.) Many of these troopers may have ended up in a deep ravine 300 to 400 yards (270 to 370 m) away from what is known today as Custer Hill. At least 28 bodies (the most common number associated with burial witness testimony), including that of scout Mitch Bouyer, were discovered in or near that gulch, their deaths possibly the battle's final actions.

Although the marker for Mitch Bouyer was found accurate through archaeological and forensic testing of remains, it is some 65 yards away from Deep Ravine. Historian Douglas Scott theorized that the "Deep Gulch" or "Deep Ravine" might have included not only the steep-sided portion of the coulee but the entire drainage including its tributaries, in which case the bodies of Bouyer and others were found where eyewitnesses had said they were seen.

Other archaeological explorations done in Deep Ravine found no human remains associated with the battle. Over the years since the battle, skeletal remains that were reportedly recovered from the mouth of the Deep Ravine by various sources have been repatriated to the Little Big Horn National Monument. According to Scott, it is likely that in the 108 years between the battle and Scott's excavation efforts in the ravine, geological processes caused many of the remains to become unrecoverable. For example, near the town of Garryowen, portions of the skeleton of a trooper killed in the Reno Retreat were recovered from an eroding bank of the Little Big Horn, while the rest of the remains had apparently been washed away by the river.

== Aftermath ==
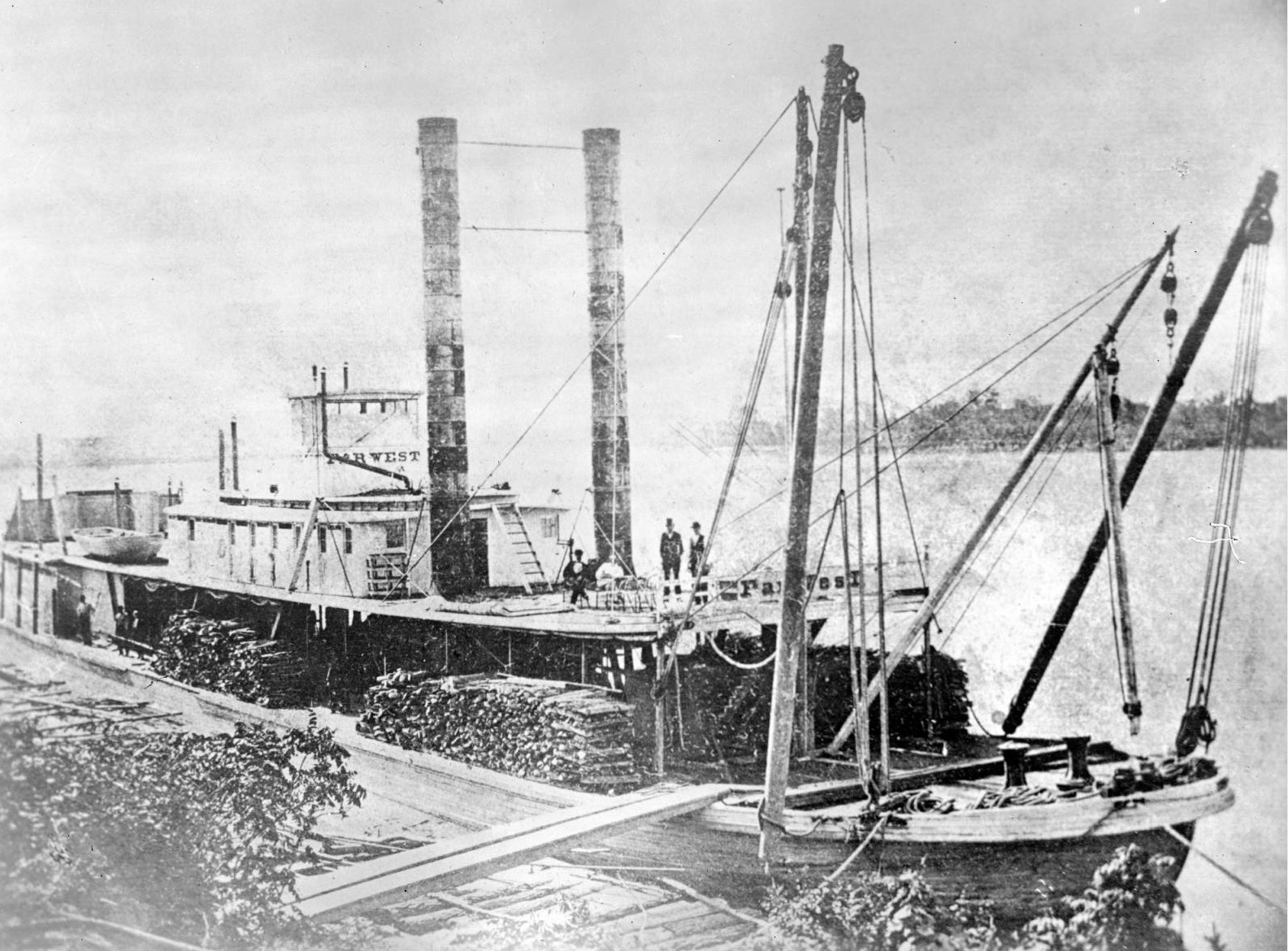
The shallow-draft steamer Far West was chartered by the Army to carry supplies for the Custer expedition. After the battle, captain and pilot Grant Marsh set a speed record bringing wounded men and news of the Custer disaster back to Fort Lincoln.

After the Custer force was annihilated, the Lakota and Northern Cheyenne regrouped to attack Reno and Benteen. The fight continued until dark (approximately 9:00 pm) and for much of the next day, with the outcome in doubt. Reno credited Benteen with repulsing a severe attack on the portion of the perimeter held by troops H and M. (Note: Reno Court of Inquiry.) On June 27, the column under General Terry approached from the north, and the natives drew off in the opposite direction. The Crow scout White Man Runs Him was the first to tell General Terry's officers that Custer's force had "been wiped out." Reno and Benteen's wounded troops were given what treatment was available at that time; five later died of their wounds. One of the regiment's three surgeons had been with Custer's column, while another, Dr. DeWolf, had been killed during Reno's retreat. The only remaining doctor was Assistant Surgeon Henry R. Porter.

When the Crow learned of the battle, they began traditional mourning practices. Crow woman Pretty Shield told how they were "crying ... for Son-of-the-morning-star [Custer] and his blue soldiers". With the defeat of Custer, there was still a real threat that the Lakota would take over the eastern part of the Crow reservation and keep up the invasion. In the end, the U.S. army won the Sioux war. Crow chief Plenty Coups recalled with amazement how his tribe now finally could sleep without fear for Lakota attacks: "this was the first time I had ever known such a condition."

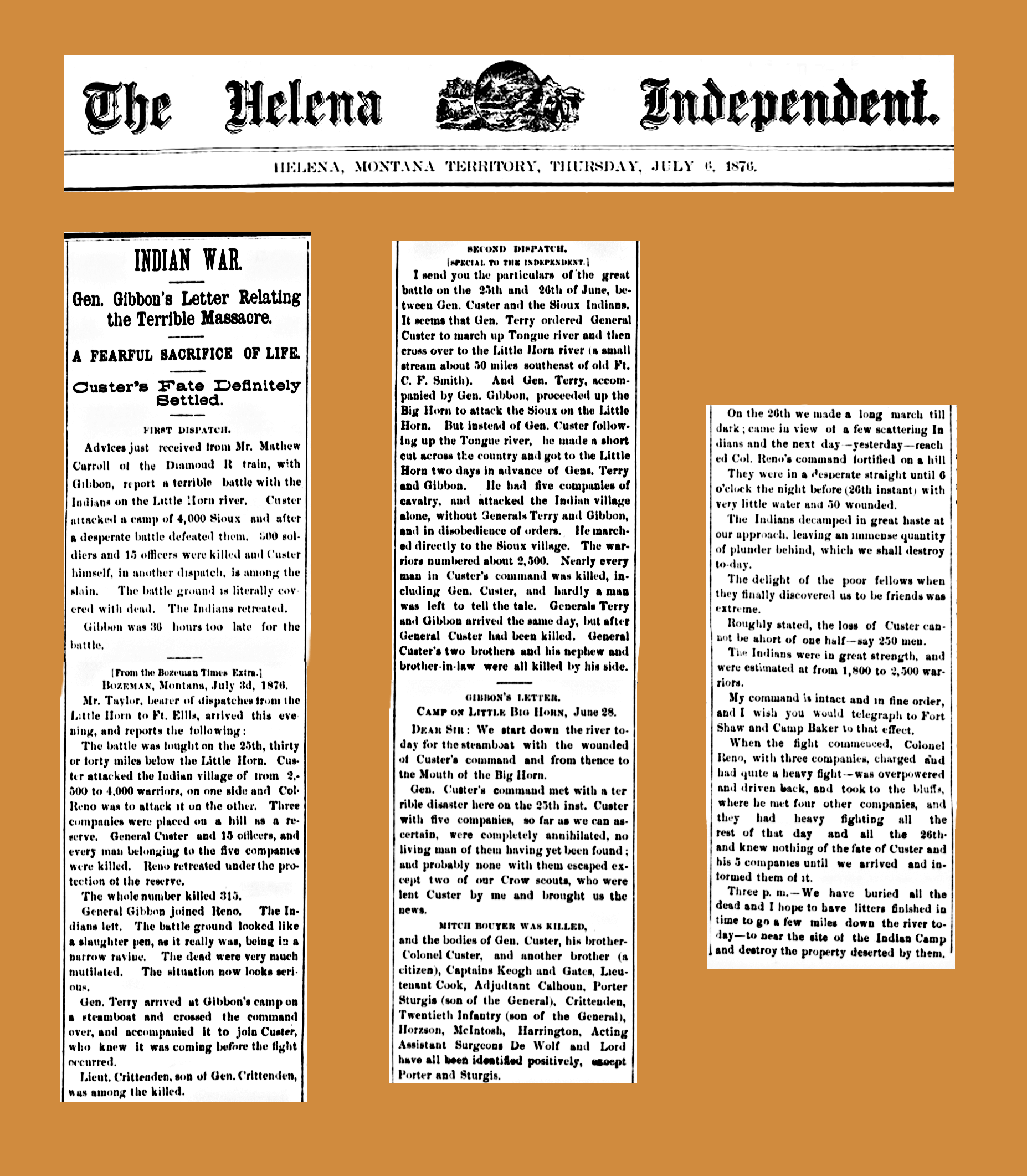
This Helena, Montana newspaper article did not report the battle until July 6, referring to a July 3 story from a Bozeman, Montana newspaper—itself eight days after the event.

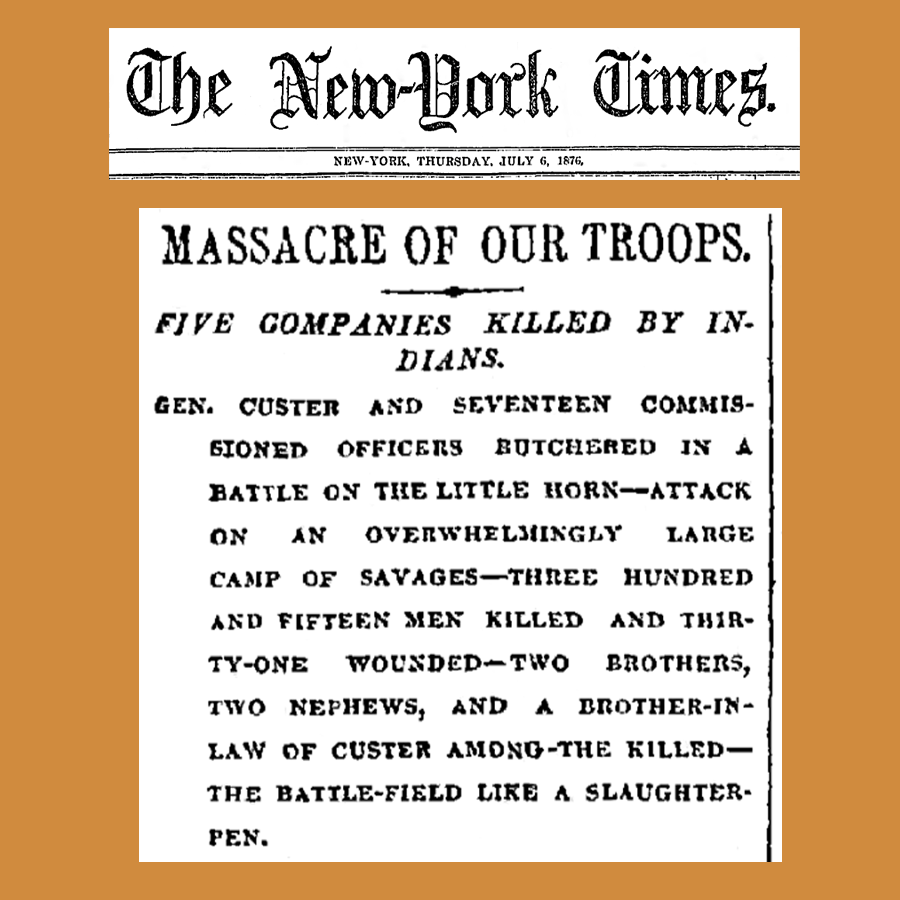
The New York Times also appears to have first reported the event on July 6. The earliest journalistic communication cited in the Times article was dated July 2—a full week after the battle. Full text is here.

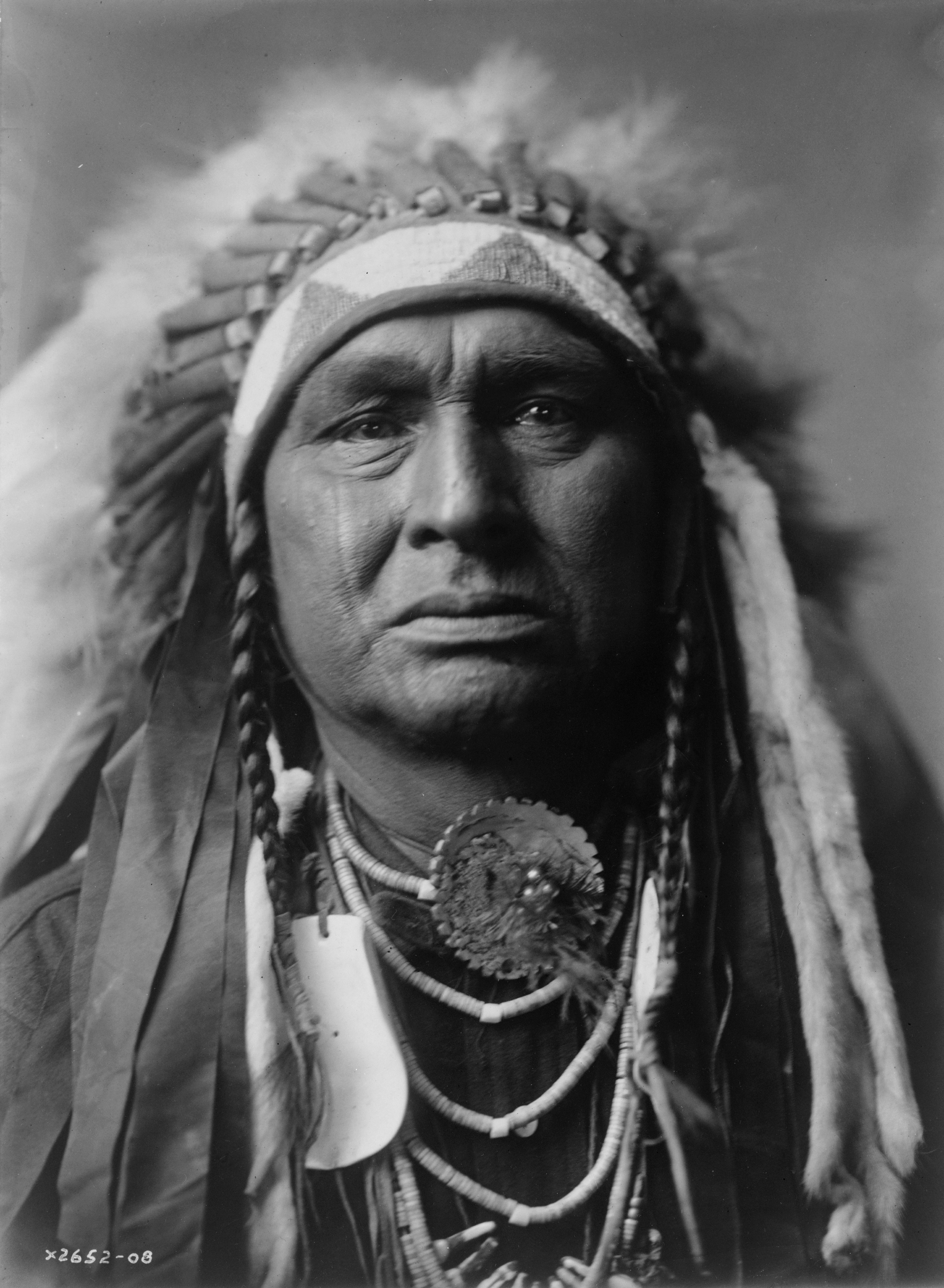
Crow scout White Man Runs Him, step-grandfather of Joe Medicine Crow

The first non-Natives to hear the news of the Custer defeat (outside of Terry's force) were those aboard the steamboat Far West, which had brought supplies for the expedition. Curley, one of Custer's scouts, rode up to the steamboat and tearfully conveyed the information to Grant Marsh, the boat's captain, and army officers. Marsh converted the Far West into a floating field hospital to carry the 52 wounded from the battle to Fort Lincoln. Traveling night and day with a full head of steam, Marsh brought the boat downriver to Bismarck, Dakota Territory, making the 710 mi (1,140 km) run in the 54 hours and bringing the first news of the military defeat, which came to be known popularly at that time as the "Custer Massacre". The editor of the Bismarck Tribune kept the telegraph operator busy for hours transmitting information to the New York Herald (for which he corresponded). News of the defeat arrived in the East as the U.S. was observing its centennial. The Army began to investigate, although its effectiveness was hampered by a concern for survivors and the reputations of the officers. Custer's widow Elizabeth Bacon Custer in particular guarded and promoted his image as a gallant hero, attacking any who cast an ill light on his reputation.

The Battle of the Little Bighorn had far-reaching consequences for the Natives. It was essentially the end of the "Indian Wars" in the north and has even been referred to as "the Indians' last stand" in the area. Within 48 hours of the battle, the large encampment on the Little Bighorn broke up into smaller groups because there was not enough game and grass to sustain a large congregation of people and horses.

Oglala Sioux Black Elk recounted the exodus this way: "We fled all night, following the Greasy Grass. My two younger brothers and I rode in a pony-drag, and my mother put some young pups in with us. They were always trying to crawl out and I was always putting them back in, so I didn't sleep much."

The scattered Sioux and Cheyenne feasted and celebrated during July with no threat from soldiers. After their celebrations, many of the Natives returned to the reservation. Soon the number of warriors amounted to only about 600. Both Crook and Terry remained immobile for seven weeks after the battle, awaiting reinforcements and unwilling to venture out against the Sioux and Cheyenne until they had at least 2,000 men. Crook and Terry finally took the field against the Native forces in August. General Nelson A. Miles took command of the effort in October 1876. In May 1877, Sitting Bull escaped to Canada. Within days, Crazy Horse surrendered at Fort Robinson, Nebraska. The Great Sioux War ended on May 7 with Miles' defeat of a remaining band of Miniconjou Sioux.

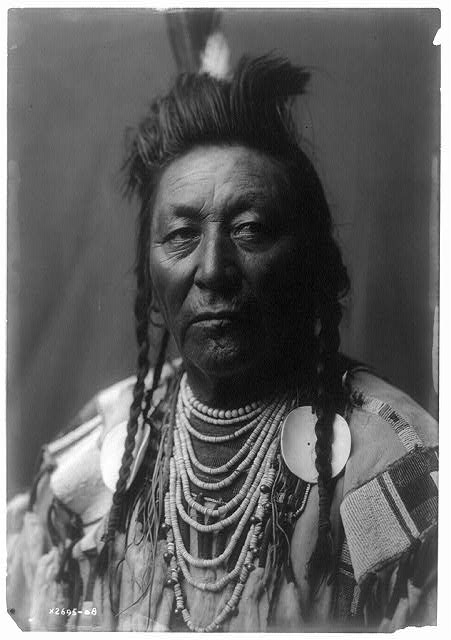
Plenty Coups Edward Curtis Portrait (c. 1908)

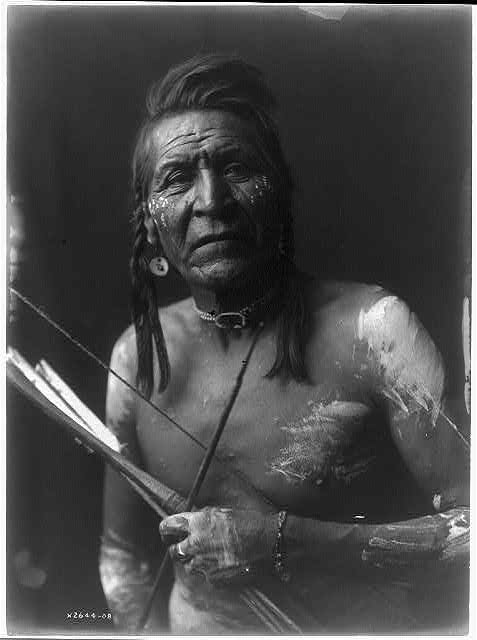
Crow warrior Two Leggings joined the U.S. army for a short time after the defeat of Custer. Two Belly had given him and nearly 30 other Crows a lecture and explained how the Sioux had taken the hunting grounds of the Crow. "Two Belly said ... we should help the soldiers drive them back to their own country."

Ownership of the Black Hills, which had been a focal point of the 1876 conflict, was determined by an ultimatum issued by the Manypenny Commission, according to which the Sioux were required to cede the land to the United States if they wanted the government to continue supplying rations to the reservations. Threatened with forced starvation, the Natives ceded Paha Sapa to the United States, but the Sioux never accepted the legitimacy of the transaction. They lobbied Congress to create a forum to decide their claim and subsequently litigated for 40 years; the United States Supreme Court in the 1980 decision United States v. Sioux Nation of Indians acknowledged (Note: According to United States v. Sioux Nation of Indians, 448 U.S. 371 (1980), the US government had to pay just compensation and interest to the Sioux for taking the Black Hills. This case confirmed the court's view that the government can treat Indian reservations like private property and take them by eminent domain if just compensation is paid.) that the United States had taken the Black Hills without just compensation. The Sioux refused the money subsequently offered and continue to insist on their right to occupy the land.

== Participants ==
=== 7th Cavalry officers ===
- Commanding Officer: Lt. Col. George Armstrong Custer (killed)
- Maj. Marcus Reno
- Adjutant: 1st Lt. William W. Cooke (killed)
- Assistant Surgeon George Edwin Lord (killed)
- Acting Assistant Surgeon James Madison DeWolf (killed)
- Acting Assistant Surgeon Henry Rinaldo Porter
- Chief of Scouts: 2nd Lt. Charles Varnum (detached from A Company, wounded)
- 2nd in command of Scouts: 2nd Lt. Luther Hare (detached from K Company)
- Pack Train commander: 1st Lt. Edward Gustave Mathey (detached from M Company)
- A Company: Capt. Myles Moylan, 1st Lt. Charles DeRudio
- B Company: Capt. Thomas McDougall, 2nd Lt. Benjamin Hodgson (killed) as Adjutant to Major Reno
- C Company: Capt. Thomas Custer (killed), 2nd Lt. Henry Moore Harrington (killed)
- D Company: Capt. Thomas Weir, 2nd Lt. Winfield Edgerly
- E Company: 1st Lt. Algernon Smith (killed), 2nd Lt. James G. Sturgis (killed)
- F Company: Capt. George Yates (killed), 2nd Lt. William Reily (killed)
- G Company: 1st Lt. Donald McIntosh (killed), 2nd Lt. George D. Wallace
- H Company: Capt. Frederick Benteen, 1st Lt. Francis Gibson
- I Company: Capt. Myles Keogh (killed), 1st Lt. James Porter (killed)
- K Company: 1st Lt. Edward Settle Godfrey
- L Company: 1st Lt. James Calhoun (killed), 2nd Lt. John J. Crittenden (killed)
- M Company: Capt. Thomas French
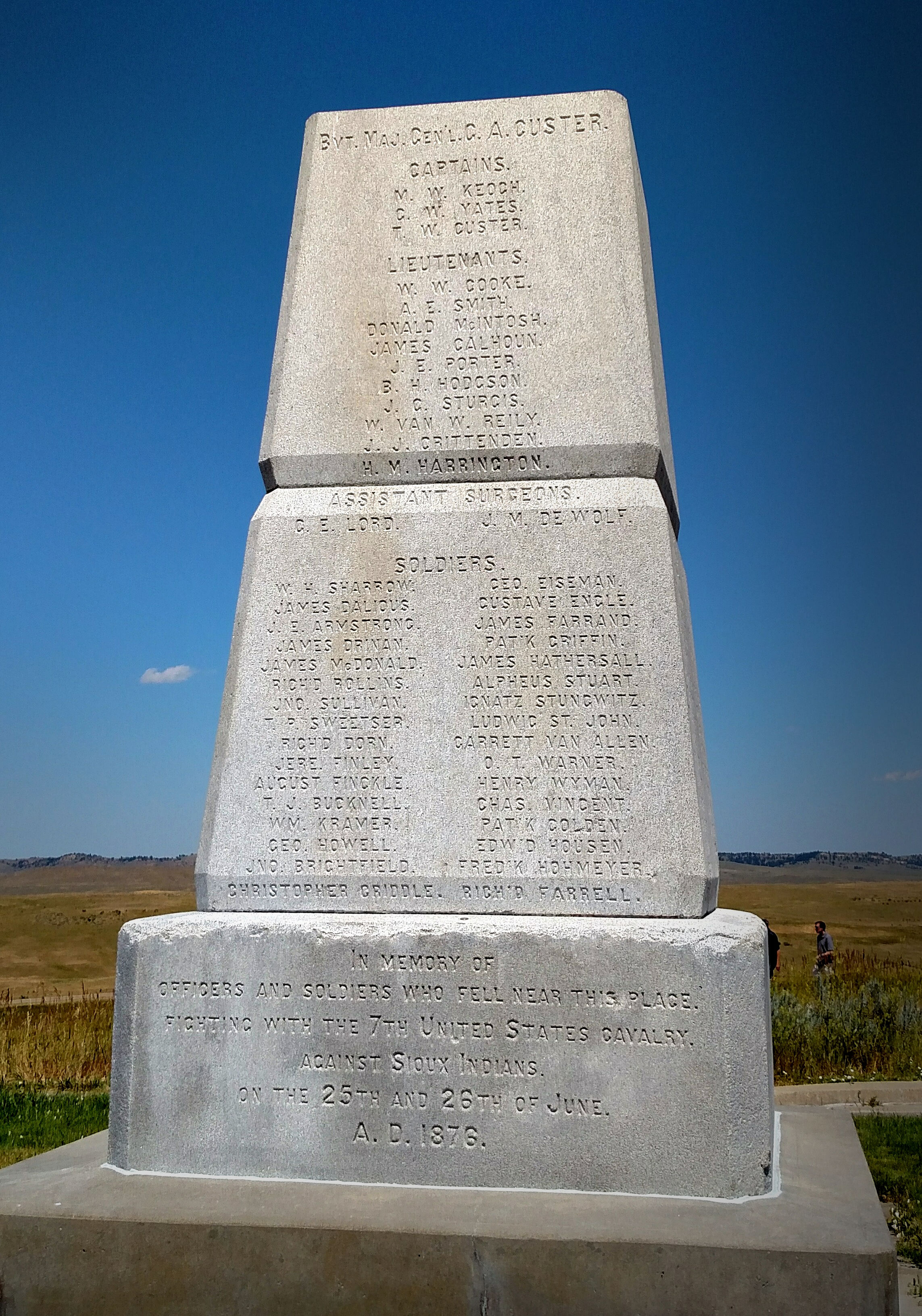
Memorial Marker as seen from the east

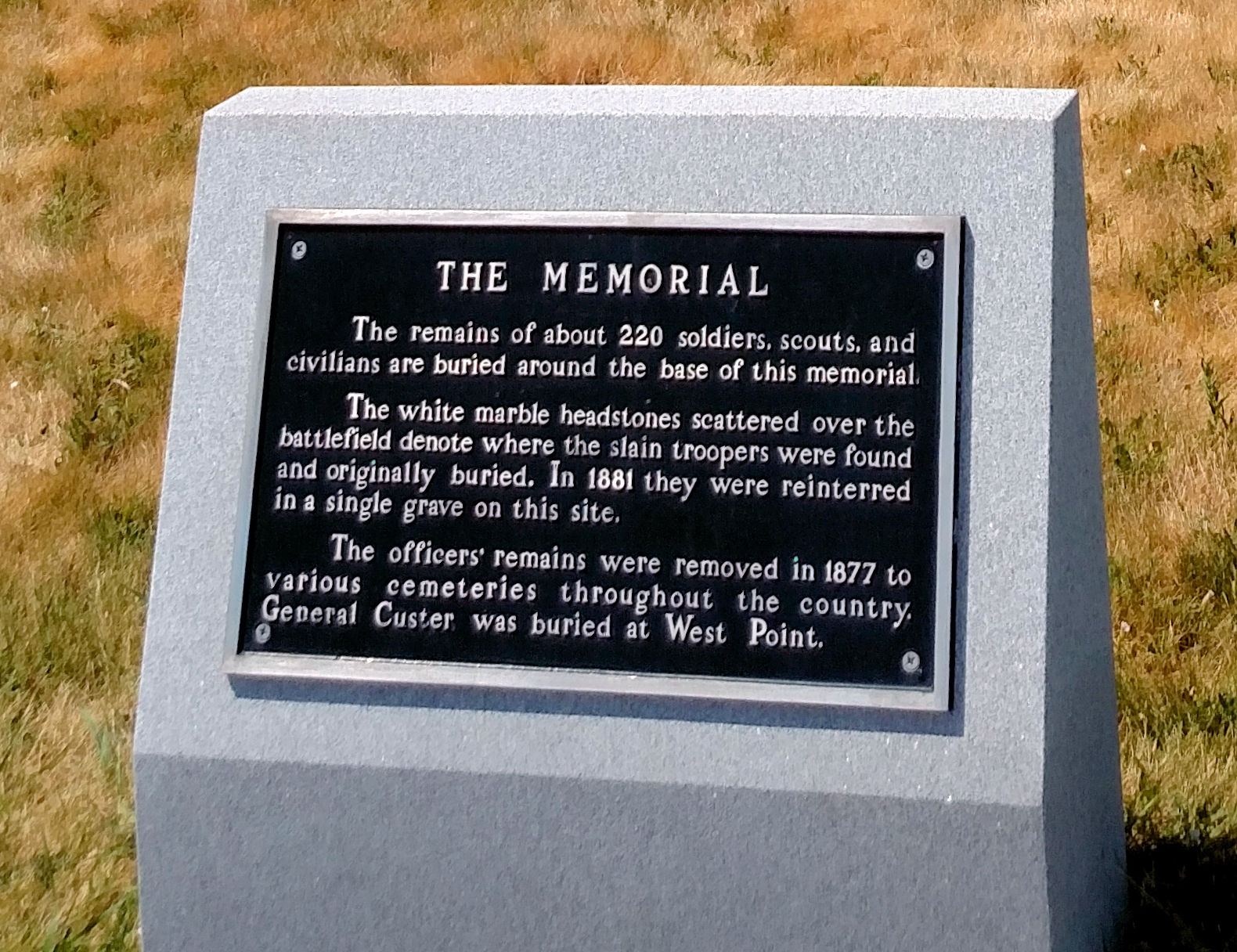
Memorial Marker plaque

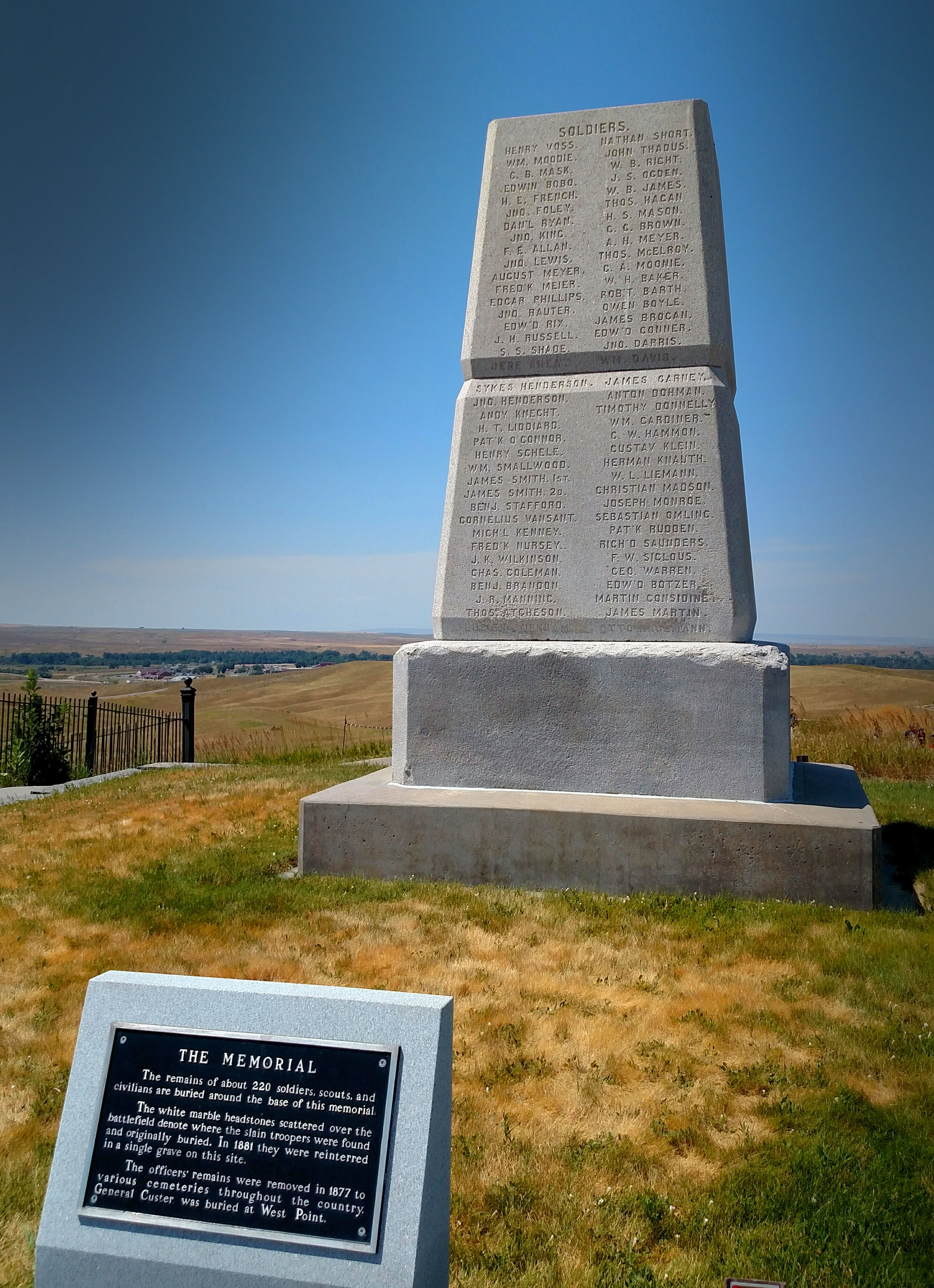
Memorial Marker as seen from the west

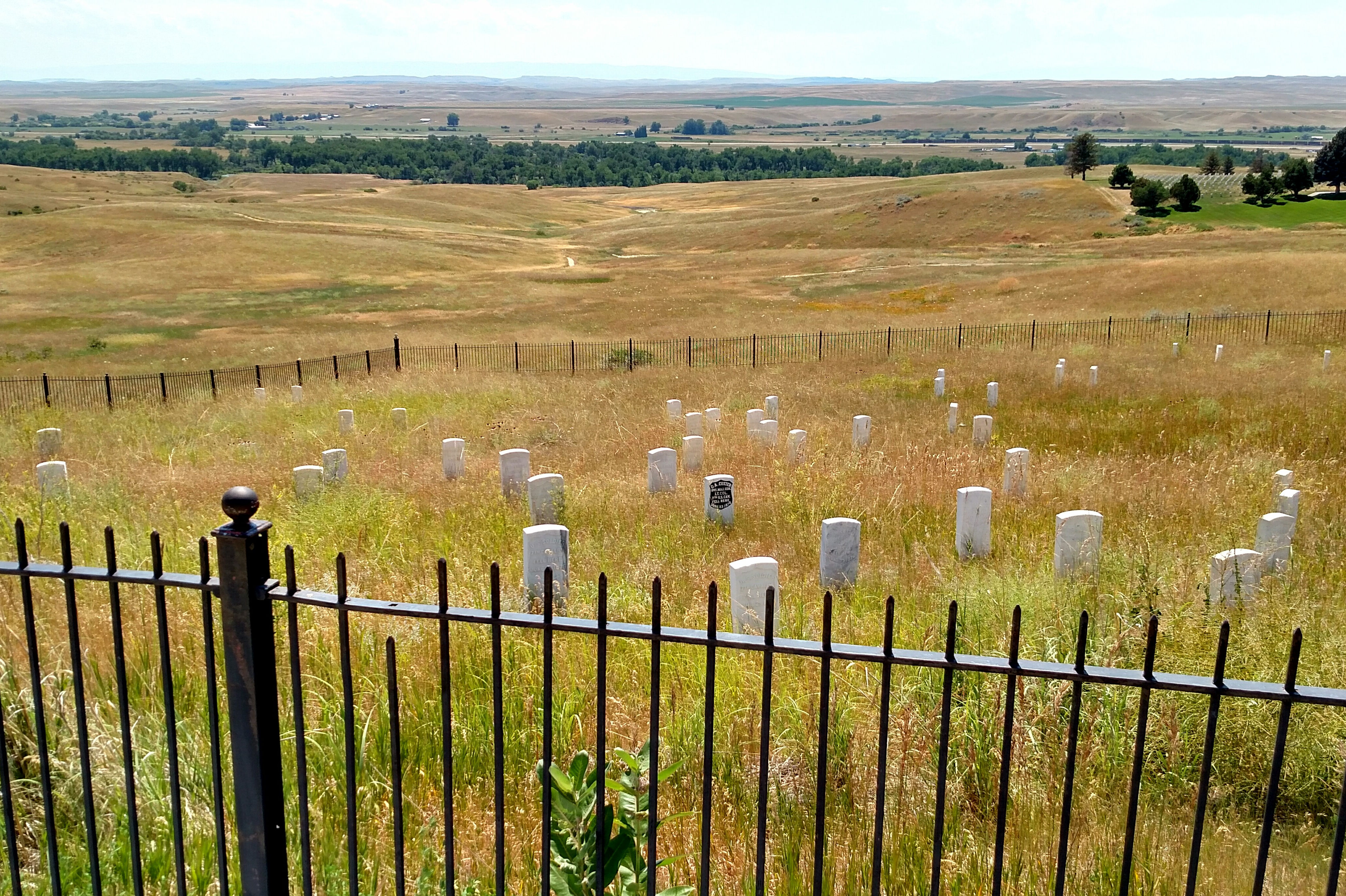
Marker indicating where General Custer fell among soldiers – denoted with black-face, in center of photo

=== Native American leaders and warriors ===
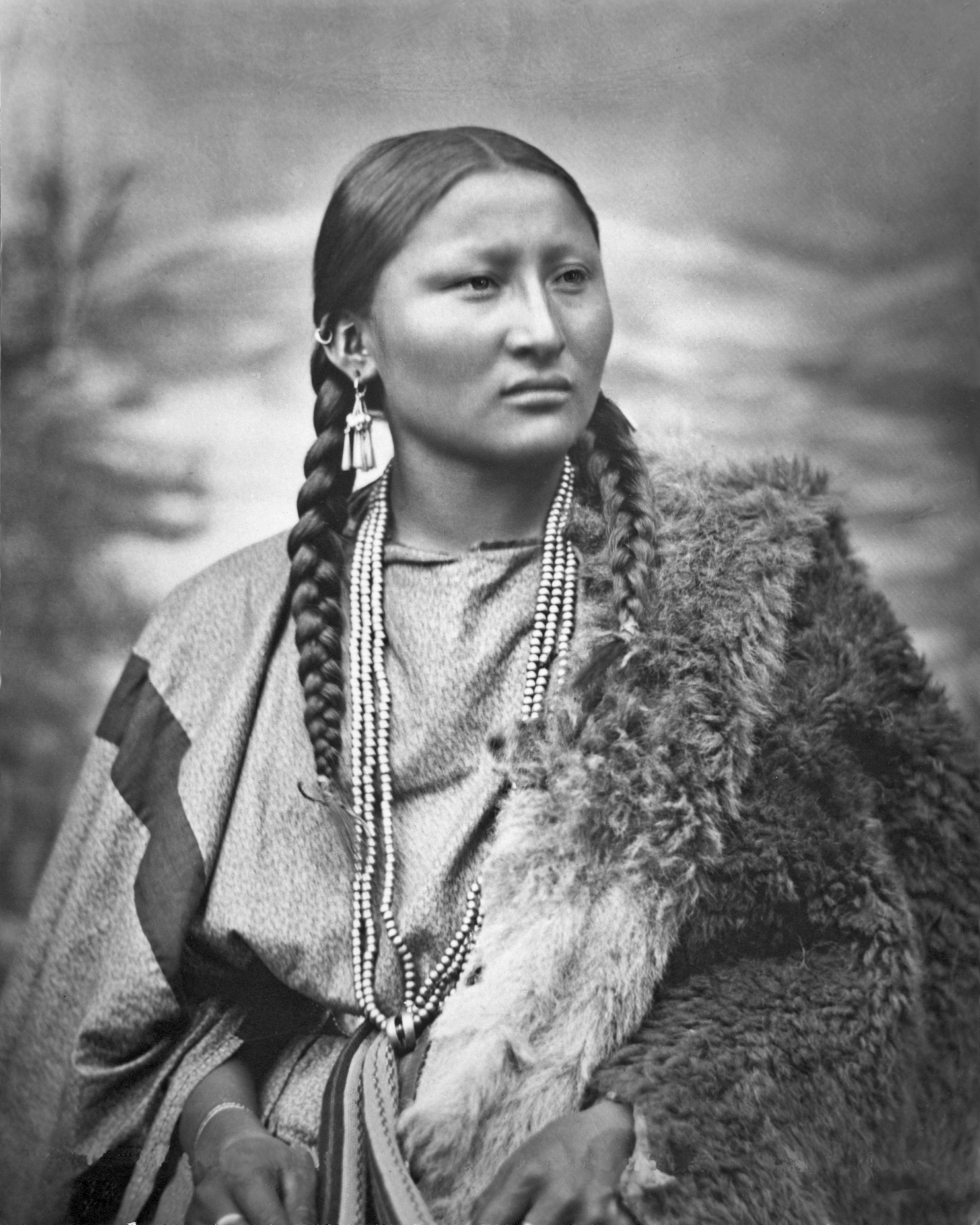
Pretty Nose who, according to her grandson, participated in the battle.

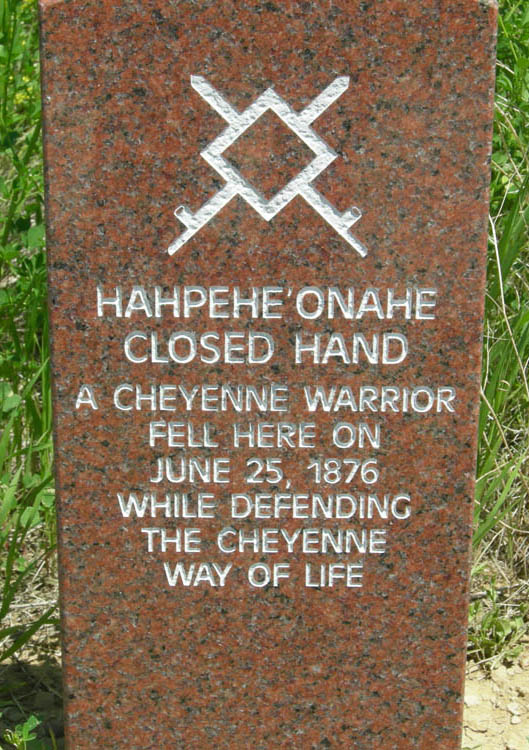
Marker stone on the battlefield

The Lakota had formed a "Strongheart Society" of caretakers and providers for the camp, consisting of men who had demonstrated compassion, generosity and bravery. As the purpose of the tribes' gathering was to take counsel, they did not constitute an army or warrior class.

- Hunkpapa (Lakota): Sitting Bull, Four Horns, Crow King, Chief Gall, Black Moon, Rain-in-the-Face, Moving Robe Woman, Spotted Horn Bull, Iron Hawk, One Bull, Bull Head, Chasing Eagle, Little Big Man
- Sihasapa (Blackfoot Lakota): Crawler, Kill Eagle
- Minneconjou (Lakota): Chief Hump, Black Moon, Red Horse, Makes Room, Looks Up, Lame Deer, Dog-with-Horn, Dog Back Bone, White Bull, Feather Earring, Flying By
- Sans Arc (Lakota): Spotted Eagle, Red Bear, Long Road, Cloud Man
- Oglala (Lakota): Crazy Horse, He Dog, Kicking Bear, Flying Hawk, Chief Long Wolf, Black Elk, White Cow Bull, Running Eagle, Black Fox II, Big Road
- Brule (Lakota): Two Eagles, Hollow Horn Bear, Brave Bird
- Two Kettles (Lakota): Runs-the-Enemy
- Lower Yanktonai (Dakota): Thunder Bear, Medicine Cloud, Iron Bear, Long Tree
- Wahpekute (Dakota): Inkpaduta, Sounds-the-Ground-as-He-Walks, White Eagle, White Tracking Earth
- Black Powder (Sioux Firearms trader): Black Powder, Johann Smidt
- Northern Cheyenne: Two Moons, Wooden Leg, Old Bear, Lame White Man (killed), American Horse, Brave Wolf, Antelope Women, Thunder Bull Big Nose, Yellow Horse, Little Shield, Horse Road, Bob Tail Horse, Yellow Hair, Bear-Walks-on-a-Ridge, Black Hawk, Buffalo Calf Road Woman, Crooked Nose, Noisy Walking
- Arapaho: Waterman, Sage, Left Hand, Yellow Eagle, Little Bird

=== Arapaho participation ===
Modern-day accounts include Arapaho warriors in the battle, but the five Arapaho men who were at the encampments were there only by accident. While on a hunting trip they came close to the village by the river and were captured and almost killed by the Lakota who believed the hunters were scouts for the U.S. Army. Two Moons, a Northern Cheyenne leader, interceded to save their lives.

=== Notable scouts/interpreters ===
The 7th Cavalry was accompanied by a number of scouts and interpreters:

- Bloody Knife: Arikara/Lakota scout (killed)
- Bob Tailed Bull: Arikara scout (killed)
- Boy Chief: Arikara scout
- Charley Reynolds: scout (killed)
- Curley: Crow scout
- Curling Head: Arikara scout
- Fred Gerard: interpreter
- Goes Ahead: Crow scout
- Goose: Arikara scout (wounded in the hand by a 7th Cavalry trooper)
- Hairy Moccasin: Crow scout
- Half Yellow Face, leader of Crow Scouts, also known as Paints Half His Face Yellow
- Isaiah Dorman: interpreter (killed)
- Little Brave: Arikara scout (killed)
- Little Sioux: Arikara scout
- Mitch Bouyer: scout/interpreter (killed)
- One Feather: Arikara scout
- Owl: Arikara scout
- Peter Jackson: half-Pikuni and half-Siksika brother of William, scout
- Red Bear: Arikara scout
- Red Star: Arikara scout
- Running Wolf: Arikara scout
- Sitting Bear: Arikara scout
- Soldier: Arikara scout
- Strikes The Lodge: Arikara scout
- Strikes Two: Arikara scout
- Two Moons: Arikara/Cheyenne scout
- White Man Runs Him: Crow scout
- White Swan: Crow Scout (severely wounded)
- William Jackson: half-Pikuni and half-Siksika scout
- Young Hawk: Arikara scout
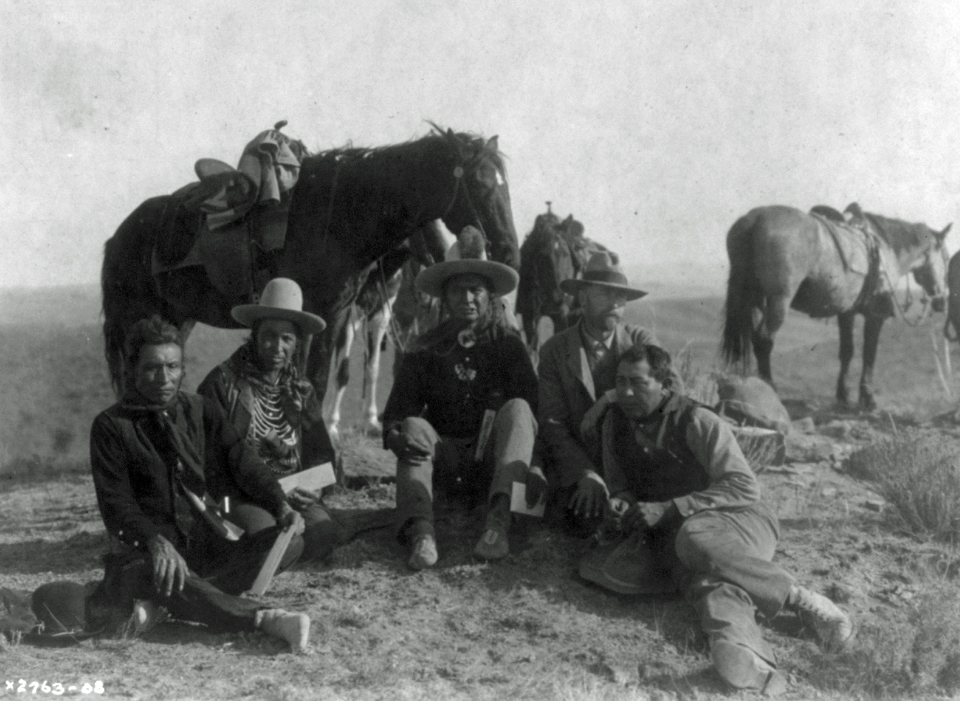
Three of Custer's scouts accompanying Edward Curtis on his investigative tour of the battlefield, c. 1907. Left to right: Goes Ahead, Hairy Moccasin, White Man Runs Him, Curtis, and Alexander B. Upshaw (Curtis's assistant and Crow interpreter)

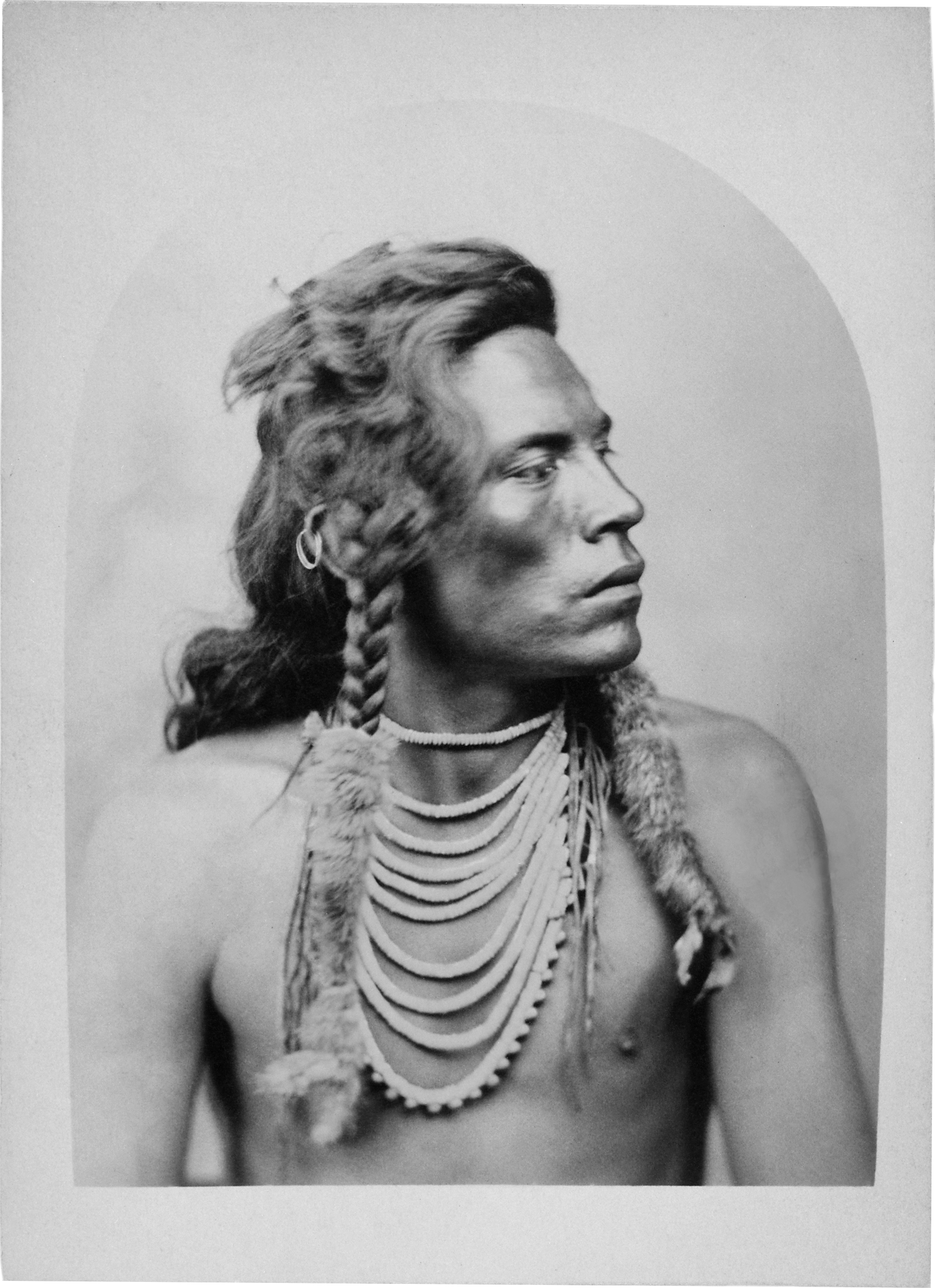
Curley, Custer's Crow scout and interpreter through the battle.

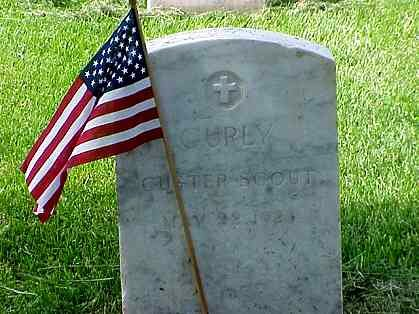
Grave of Curley

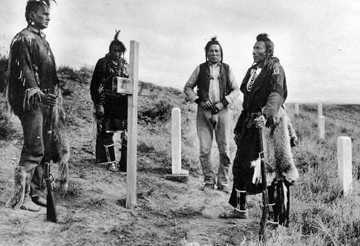
Former U.S. Army Crow scouts visiting the Little Bighorn battlefield, c. 1913

== Order of battle ==
Native Americans
Native Americans	Tribe	Leaders
Native Americans	Lakota Sioux	Hunkpapa: Sitting Bull, Four Horns, Crow King, Chief Gall, Black Moon, Rain-in-the-Face, Moving Robe Women, Spotted Horn Bull, Iron Hawk, One Bull, Bull Head, Chasing Eagle; Sihasapa: Crawler, Kill Eagle; Minneconjou: Chief Hump, Black Moon, Red Horse, Makes Room, Looks Up, Lame Deer, Dog-with-Horn, Dog Back Bone, White Bull, Feather Earring, Flying By; Sans Arc: Spotted Eagle, Red Bear, Long Road, Cloud Man; Oglala: Crazy Horse, He Dog, Kicking Bear, Flying Hawk, American Horse the Elder, Chief Long Wolf, Black Elk, White Cow Bull, Running Eagle, Black Fox II; Brule: Two Eagles, Hollow Horn Bear, Brave Bird; Two Kettles: Runs-the-Enemy
Native Americans	Dakota Sioux	Lower Yanktonai: Thunder Bear, Medicine Cloud, Iron Bear, Long Tree; Wahpekute: Inkpaduta, Sounds-the-Ground-as-He-Walks, White Eagle, White Tracking Earth
Native Americans	Northern Cheyenne	Northern Cheyenne: Two Moons, Wooden Leg, Old Bear, Lame White Man †, American Horse, Brave Wolf, Antelope Women, Thunder Bull Big Nose, Yellow Horse, Little Shield, Horse Road, Bob Tail Horse, Yellow Hair, Bear-Walks-on-a-Ridge, Black Hawk, Buffalo Calf Road Woman, Crooked Nose, Noisy Walking†
Native Americans	Arapaho	Arapahoes: Waterman, Sage, Left Hand, Yellow Eagle, Little Bird

United States Army, Lieutenant Colonel George A. Custer, 7th United States Cavalry Regiment, commanding
7th United States Cavalry regiment	Battalion	Companies and others
Lieutenant Colonel George A. Custer †, commanding	Custer's Battalion Lieutenant Colonel George A. Custer†	Company C: Captain Thomas Custer†; Company E: First Lieutenant Algernon Smith†; Company F: Captain George Yates†; Company I: Captain Myles Keogh†; Company L: First Lieutenant James Calhoun†
Lieutenant Colonel George A. Custer †, commanding	Reno's Battalion Major Marcus Reno	Company A: Captain Myles Moylan; Company G: First Lieutenant Donald McIntosh†; Company M: Captain Thomas French†
Lieutenant Colonel George A. Custer †, commanding	Benteen's Battalion Captain Frederick Benteen	Company D: Captain Thomas Weir; Company H: Captain Frederick Benteen; Company K: First Lieutenant Edward Settle Godfrey†
Lieutenant Colonel George A. Custer †, commanding	Pack train First Lieutenant Edward Gustave Mathey	Company B: Captain Thomas McDougall
Lieutenant Colonel George A. Custer †, commanding	Scouts and interpreters Second Lieutenant Charles Varnum†, Chief of Scouts	Bloody Knife†, Charley Reynolds†, Isaiah Dorman †, Mitch Bouyer †, Bob Tailed Bull†, Little Brave†, White Swan (severely wounded), Goose (wounded), Curley, Curling Head, Fred Gerard, Goes Ahead, Boy Chief, Hairy Moccasin, Half Yellow Face (Paints Half His Face Yellow), Little Sioux, One Feather, Owl, Peter Jackson, William Jackson, Red Bear, Red Star, Running Wolf, Sitting Bear†, Soldier, Strikes The Lodge†, Strikes Two, Two Moons, White Man Runs Him, Young Hawk

== Casualties ==
=== Native American warriors ===
Estimates of Native American casualties have differed widely, from as few as 36 dead (from Native American listings of the dead by name) to as many as 300. Lakota chief Red Horse told Col. W. H. Wood in 1877 that the Native Americans suffered 136 dead and 160 wounded during the battle. In 1881, Red Horse told Dr. C. E. McChesney the same numbers but in a series of drawings done by Red Horse to illustrate the battle, he drew only sixty figures representing Lakota and Cheyenne casualties. Of those sixty figures, only thirty-some are portrayed with a conventional Plains Indian method of indicating death. In the last 140 years, historians have been able to identify multiple Indian names pertaining to the same individual, which has greatly reduced previously inflated numbers. Today a list of positively known casualties exists that lists 99 names, attributed and consolidated to 31 identified warriors.

Red Horse pictographic account of Lakota casualties in the Battle of the Little Bighorn, 1881
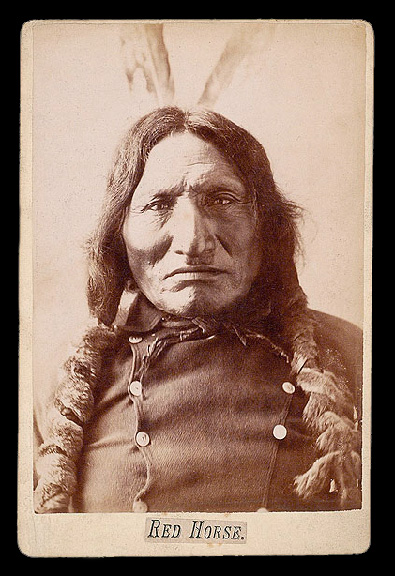
Red Horse

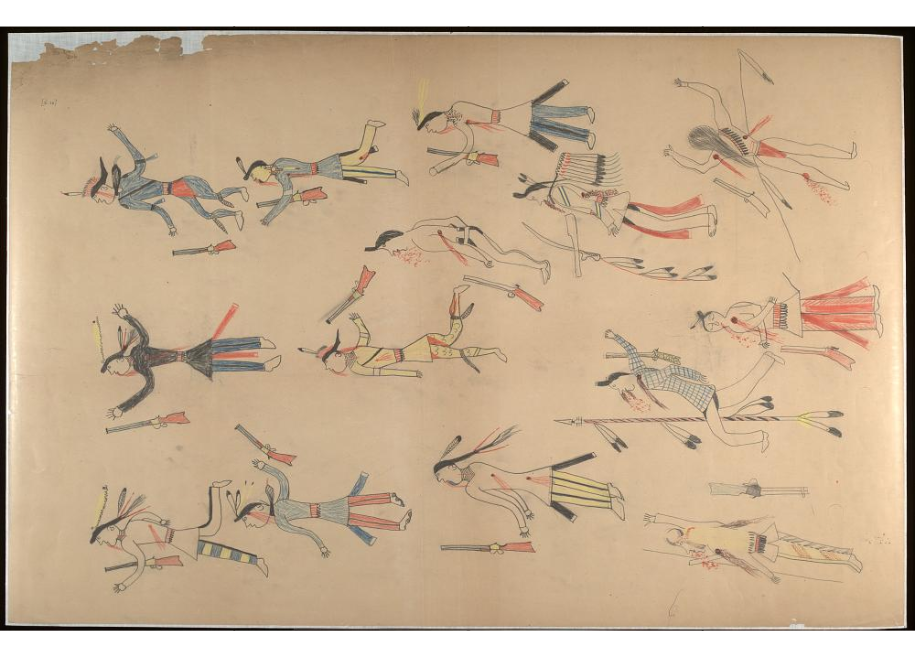

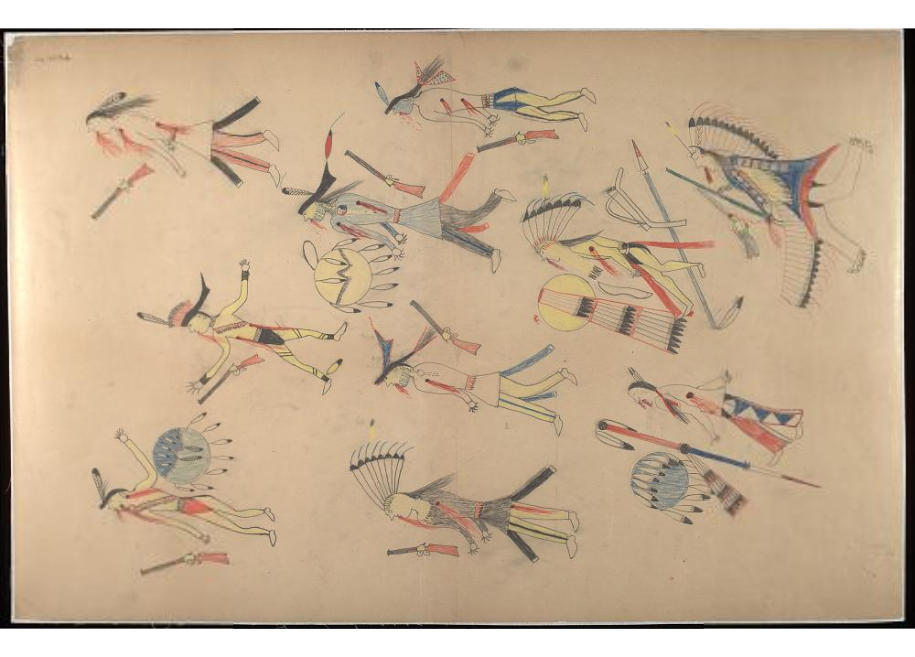

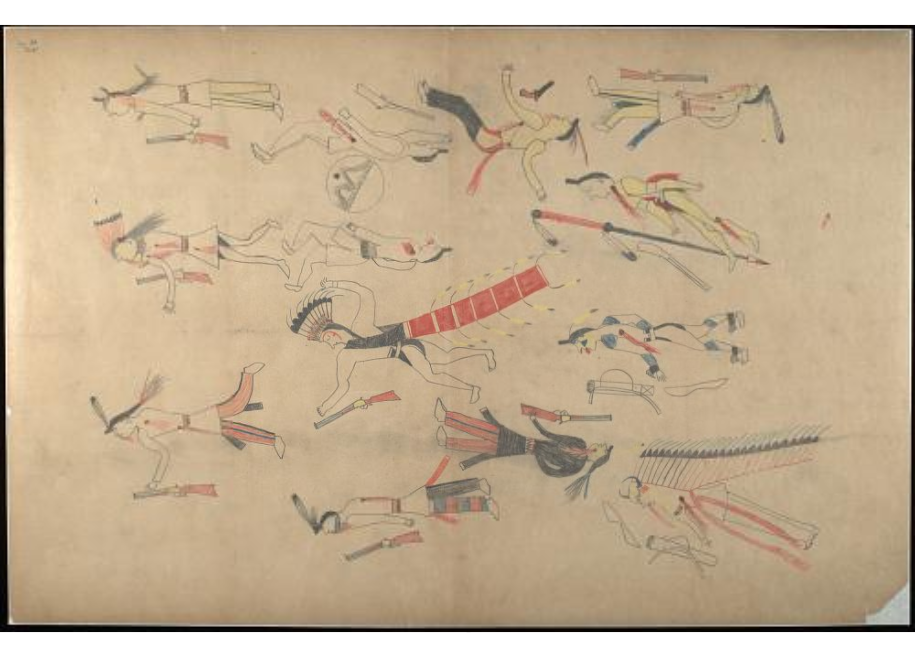
Plate XLIV

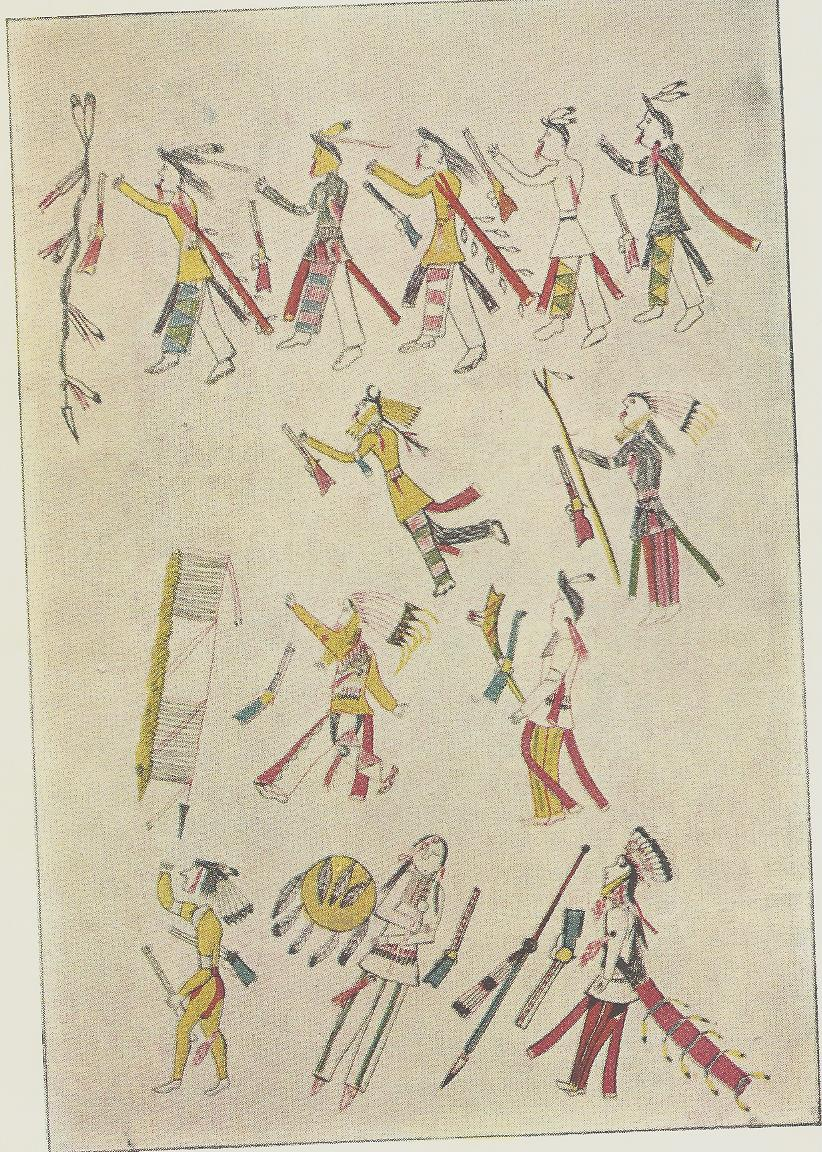
Plate XLV

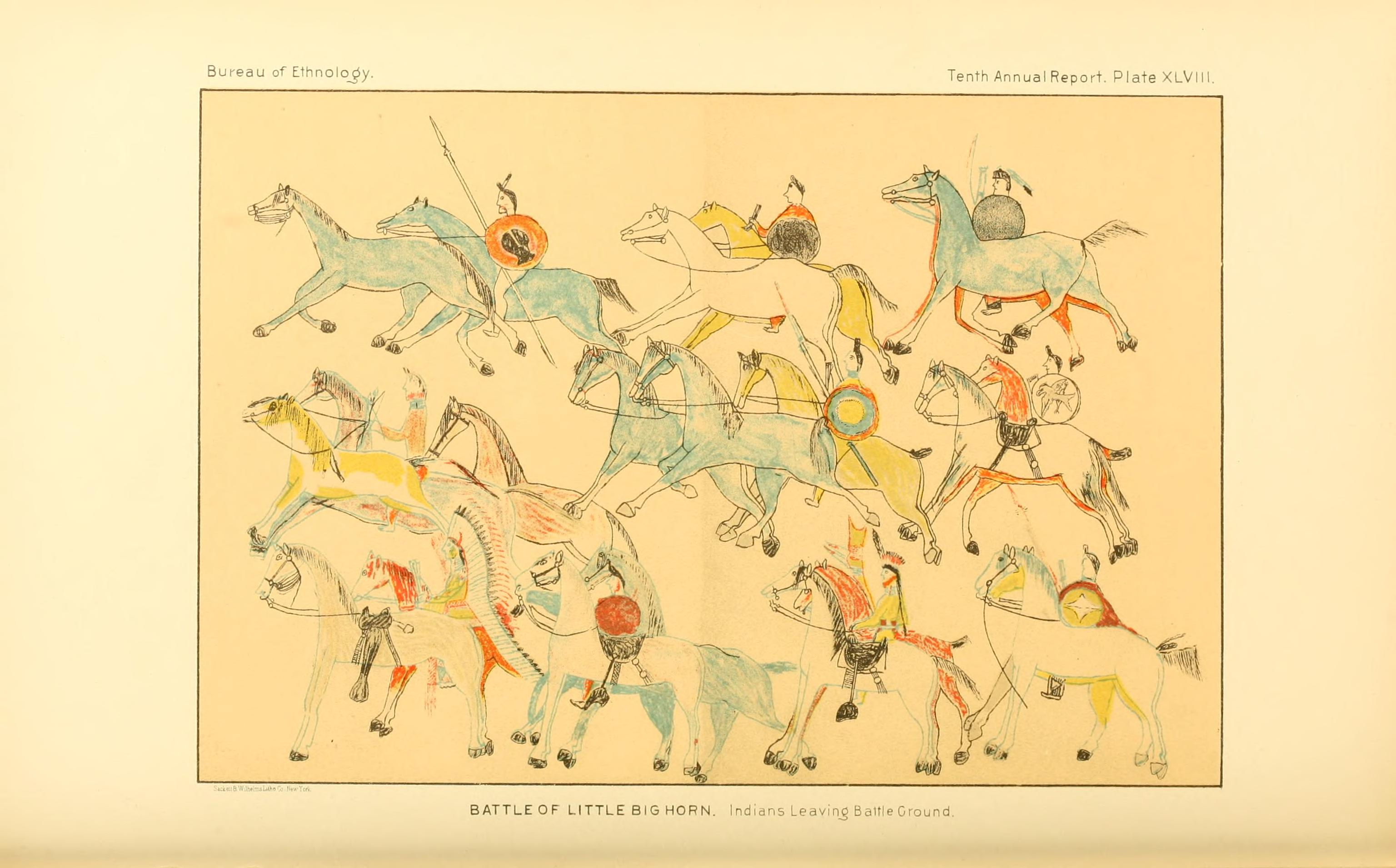
Indians leaving the Battlefield Plate XLVIII

=== Native American noncombatants ===
Six unnamed Native American women and four unnamed children are known to have been killed at the beginning of the battle during Reno's charge. Among them were two wives and three children of the Hunkpapa Leader Phizí (Gall).

=== 7th Cavalry ===
The 7th Cavalry suffered 52 percent casualties: 16 officers and 242 troopers killed or died of wounds, 1 officer and 51 troopers wounded. Every soldier of the five companies with Custer was killed (except for some Crow scouts and several troopers that had left that column before the battle or as the battle was starting). Among the dead were Custer's brothers Boston and Thomas, his brother-in-law James Calhoun, and his nephew Henry Reed.

In 1878, the army awarded 24 Medals of Honor to participants in the fight on the bluffs for bravery, most for risking their lives to carry water from the river up the hill to the wounded. Few on the non-Indian side questioned the conduct of the enlisted men, but many questioned the tactics, strategy and conduct of the officers. Indian accounts spoke of soldiers' panic-driven flight and suicide by those unwilling to fall captive to the Indians. While such stories were gathered by Thomas Bailey Marquis in a book in the 1930s, it was not published until 1976 because of the unpopularity of such assertions. Although soldiers may have believed captives would be tortured, Indians usually killed men outright and took as captive for adoption only young women and children. Indian accounts also noted the bravery of soldiers who fought to the death.

Red Horse pictographic account of dead U.S. cavalrymen in the Battle of the Little Bighorn, 1881
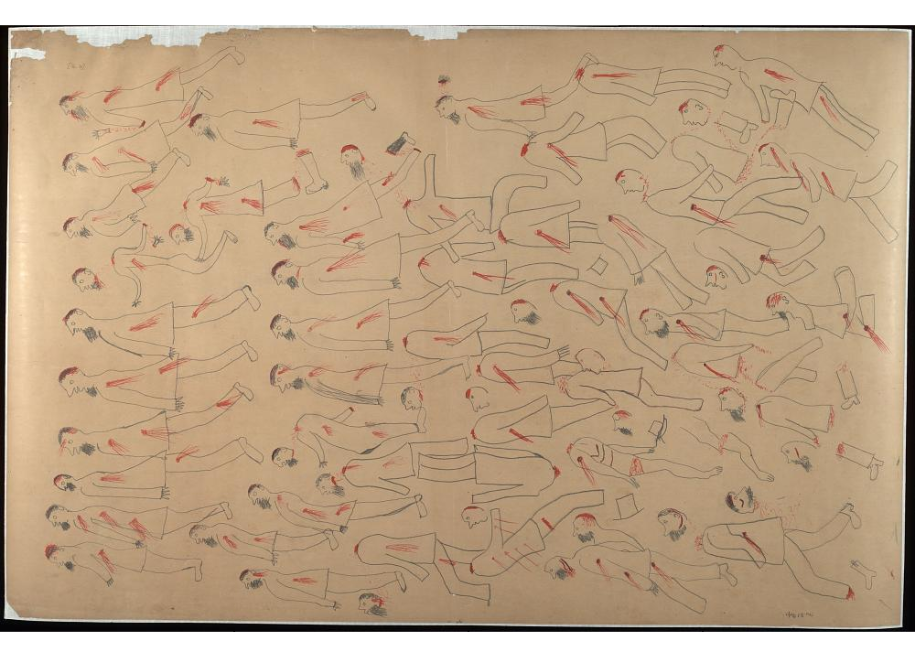

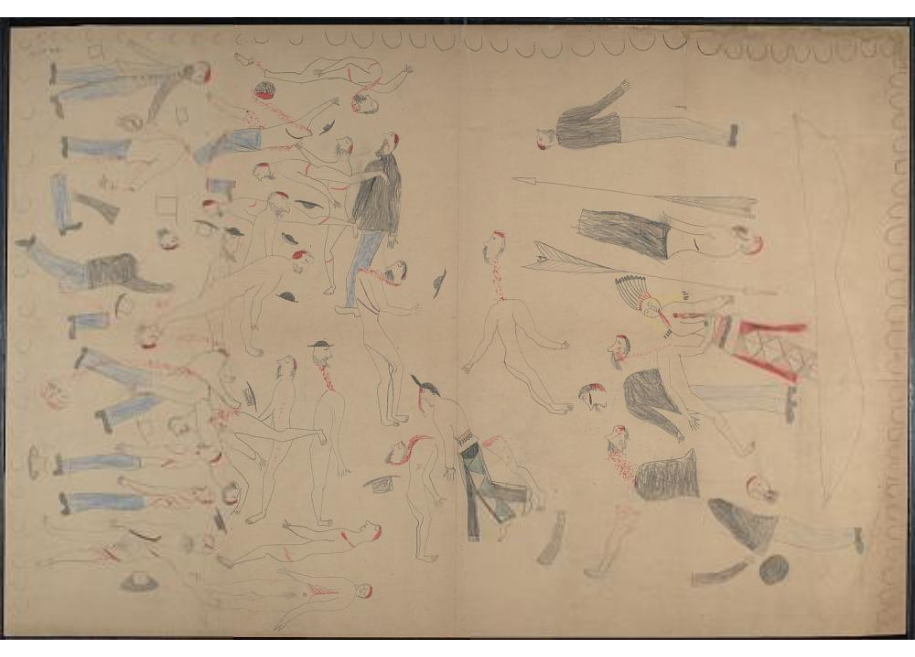
Cavalrymen and two Indian Government scouts[?]

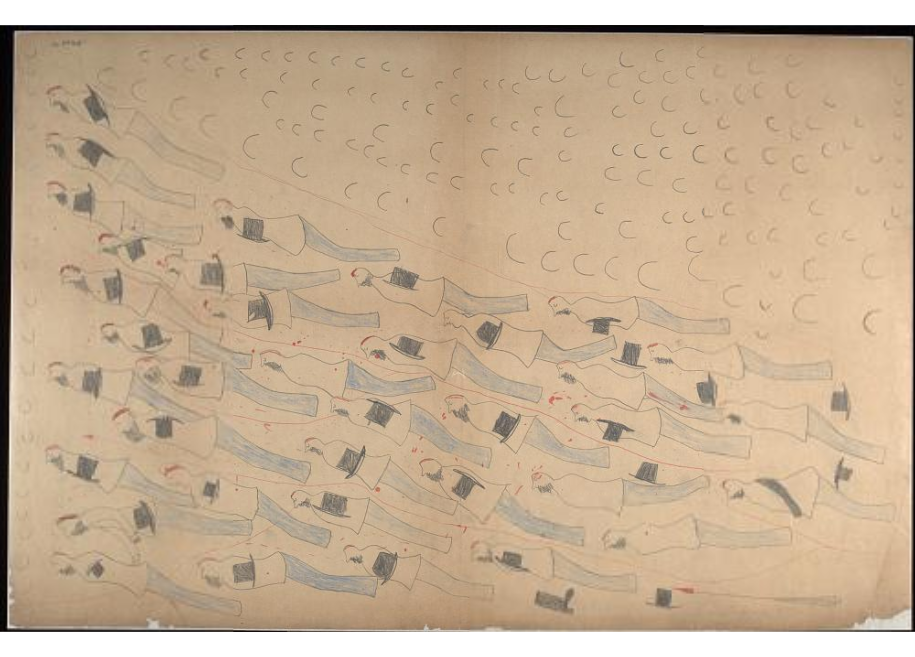

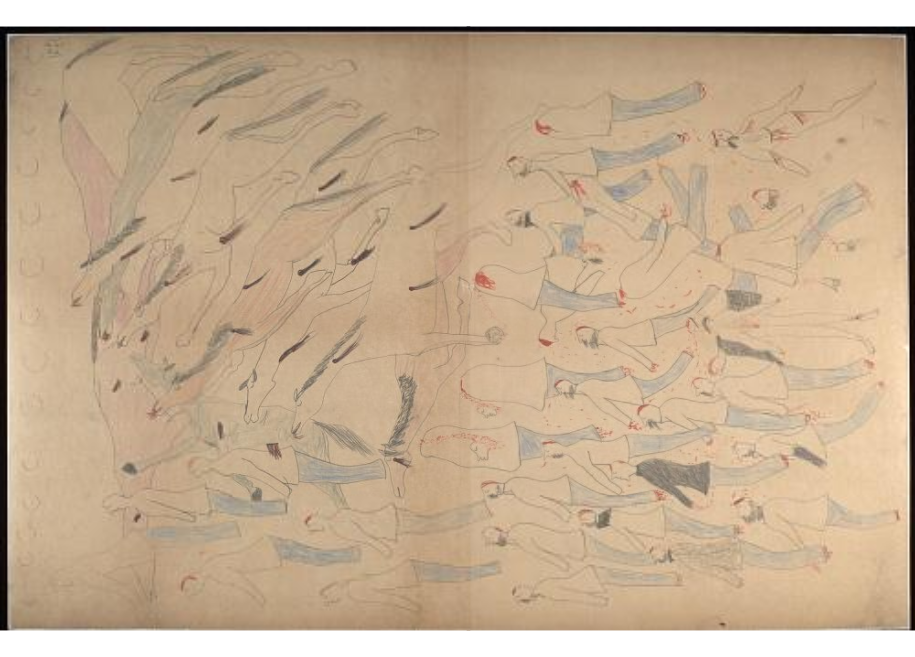
Cavalrymen and dead cavalry horses

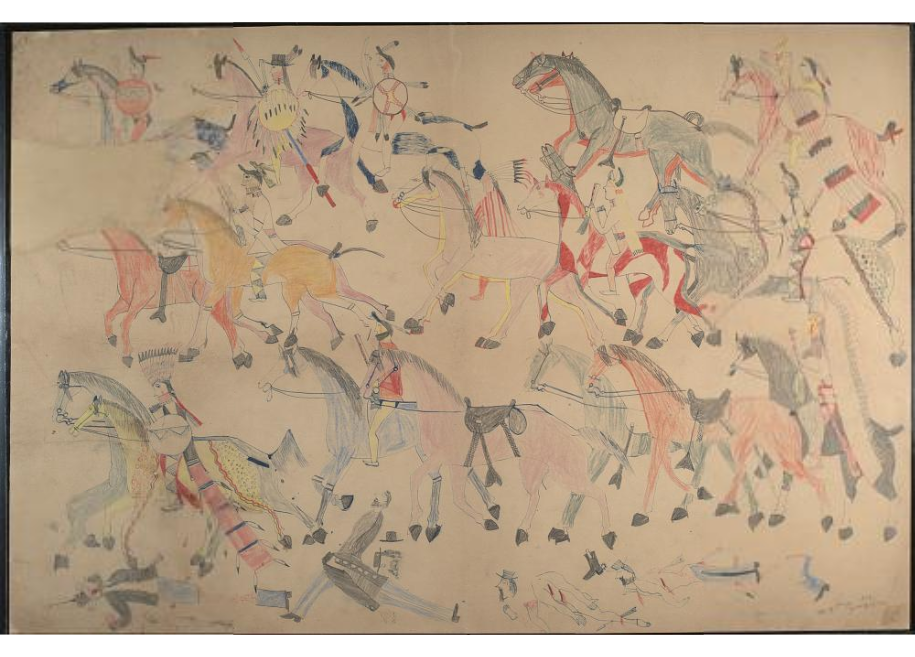

=== Civilians killed (armed and embedded within the Army) ===
- Boston Custer: brother of George and Thomas, forager for the 7th
- Mark Kellogg: reporter
- Frank Mann: ex-cavalry soldier and civilian packer. Killed in Reno battle
- Henry Armstrong Reed: Custer's nephew, herder for the 7th
- Charles Reynolds, ex-soldier and civilian guide

== Legacy ==
=== Reconstitution of the 7th Cavalry ===
Beginning in July, the 7th Cavalry was assigned new officers (Note: Major Elmer I. Otis of the 1st Cavalry was promoted to replace Custer effective June 25, 1876, but did not report until February 1877. Two 1876 West Point graduates designated for the 7th Cavalry were advanced to 1st lieutenant effective 10 days after their graduation. Four others appointed to other regiments, along with eight experienced 2nd lieutenants, were transferred and designated one to each company of the 7th. However, five declined the appointment, replaced by 2nd lieutenants of infantry and unappointed new officers in July and August 1876. Only three replacements were able to report while the 7th was still in the field.) and recruiting efforts began to fill the depleted ranks. The regiment, reorganized into eight companies, remained in the field as part of the Terry Expedition, now based on the Yellowstone River at the mouth of the Bighorn and reinforced by Gibbon's column. On August 8, 1876, after Terry was further reinforced with the 5th Infantry, the expedition moved up Rosebud Creek in pursuit of the Lakota. It met with Crook's command, similarly reinforced, and the combined force, almost 4,000 strong, followed the Lakota trail northeast toward the Little Missouri River. Persistent rain and lack of supplies forced the column to dissolve and return to its varying starting points. The 7th Cavalry returned to Fort Abraham Lincoln to reconstitute. The regimental commander, Colonel Samuel D. Sturgis, returned from his detached duty in St. Louis, Missouri. Sturgis led the 7th Cavalry in the campaign against the Nez Perce in 1877.

=== Expansion of the U.S. Army ===
The U.S. Congress authorized appropriations to expand the Army by 2,500 men to meet the emergency after the defeat of the 7th Cavalry. For a session, the Democratic Party-controlled House of Representatives abandoned its campaign to reduce the size of the Army. Word of Custer's fate reached the 44th United States Congress as a conference committee was attempting to reconcile opposing appropriations bills approved by the House and the Republican Senate. They approved a measure to increase the size of cavalry companies to 100 enlisted men on July 24. The committee temporarily lifted the ceiling on the size of the Army by 2,500 on August 15.

=== "Sell or Starve" ===
As a result of the defeat in June 1876, Congress responded by attaching what the Sioux call the "sell or starve" rider (19 Stat. 192) to the Indian Appropriations Act of 1876 (enacted August 15, 1876), which cut off all rations for the Sioux until they terminated hostilities and ceded the Black Hills to the United States. The Agreement of 1877 (19 Stat. 254, enacted February 28, 1877) officially took away Sioux land and permanently established Indian reservations.

== Controversies ==
=== Reno's conduct ===
The Battle of the Little Bighorn was the subject of an 1879 U.S. Army Court of Inquiry in Chicago, held at Reno's request, during which his conduct was scrutinized. Some testimony by non-Army officers suggested that he was drunk and a coward. The court found Reno's conduct to be without fault. After the battle, Thomas Rosser, James O'Kelly, and others continued to question the conduct of Reno for his hastily ordered retreat. Defenders of Reno at the trial noted that while the retreat was disorganized, Reno did not withdraw from his position until it became apparent that he was outnumbered and outflanked by the Native Americans. Contemporary accounts also point to the fact that Reno's scout Bloody Knife was shot in the head, spraying the major with blood, possibly increasing his panic and distress.

=== Custer's errors ===
General Terry and others claimed that Custer made strategic errors from the start of the campaign. For instance, he refused to use a battery of Gatling guns and turned down General Terry's offer of an additional battalion of the 2nd Cavalry. Custer believed that the Gatling guns would impede his march up the Rosebud and hamper his mobility. His rapid march en route to the Little Bighorn averaged nearly 30 miles (48 km) a day, so his assessment appears to have been accurate. Custer planned "to live and travel like Indians; in this manner the command will be able to go wherever the Indians can", he wrote in his Herald dispatch.

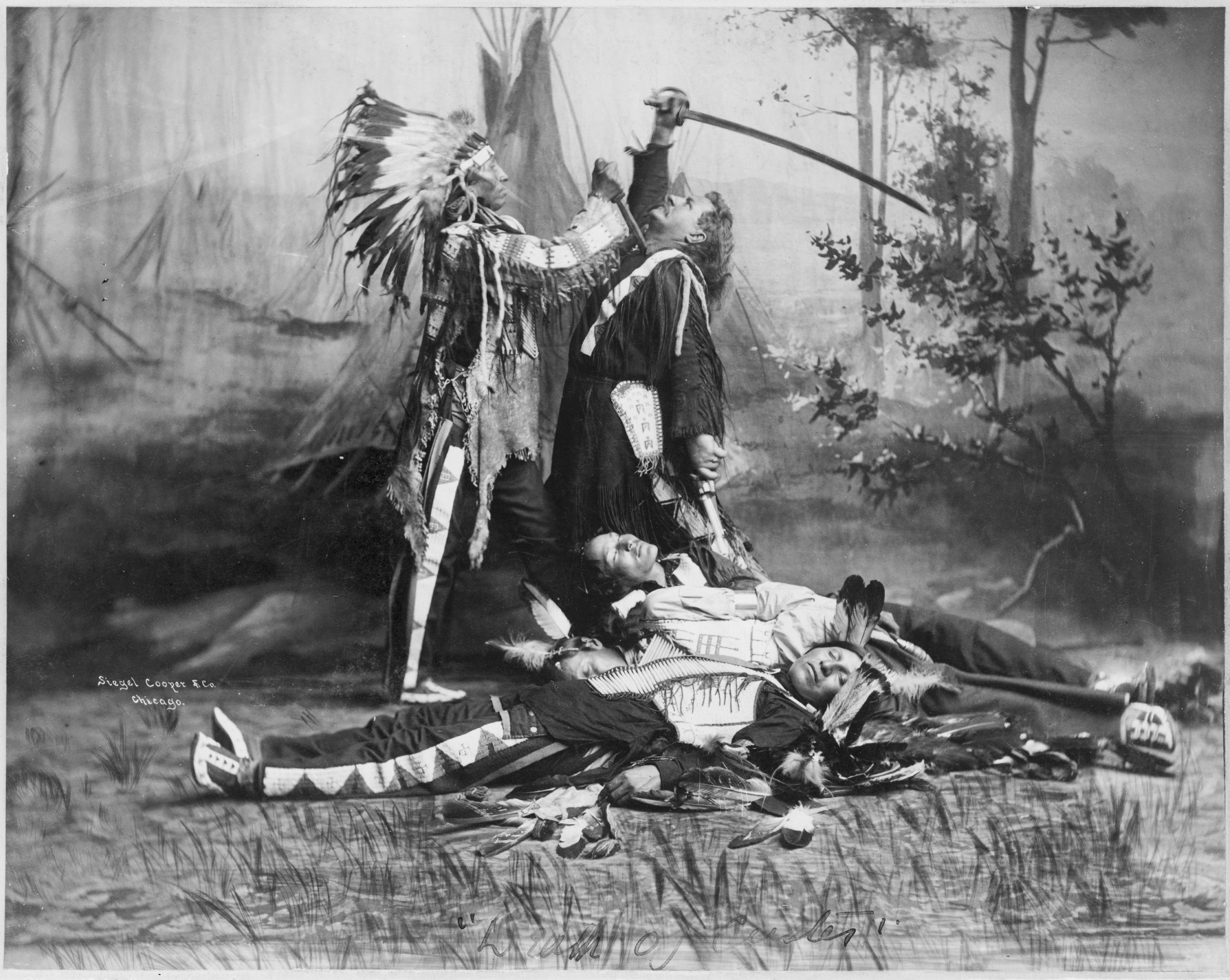
Death of Custer, scene by Pawnee Bill's Wild West Show performers c. 1905 of Sitting Bull's stabbing Custer, with dead Native Americans lying on ground

By contrast, each Gatling gun had to be hauled by four horses, and soldiers often had to drag the heavy guns by hand over obstacles. Each of the heavy hand-cranked weapons could fire up to 350 rounds a minute, an impressive rate, but they were known to jam frequently. During the Black Hills Expedition two years earlier, a Gatling gun had turned over, rolled down a mountain, and shattered into pieces. Lieutenant William Low, commander of the artillery detachment, was said to have almost wept when he learned he had been excluded from the strike force.

Custer believed that the 7th Cavalry could handle any Indian force and that the addition of the four companies of the 2nd would not alter the outcome. When offered the 2nd Cavalry, he reportedly replied that the 7th "could handle anything." There is evidence that Custer suspected that he would be outnumbered by the Indians, although he did not know by how much. By dividing his forces, Custer could have caused the defeat of the entire column had it not been for Benteen's and Reno's joining forces to make a desperate yet successful stand on the bluff above the southern end of the camp.

The historian James Donovan believed that Custer's dividing his force into four smaller detachments (including the pack train) can be attributed to his inadequate reconnaissance; he also ignored the warnings of his Crow scouts and Charley Reynolds. By the time the battle began, Custer had already divided his forces into three battalions of differing sizes, of which he kept the largest. His men were widely scattered and unable to support each other. Wanting to prevent any escape by the combined tribes to the south, where they could disperse into different groups, Custer believed that an immediate attack on the south end of the camp was the best course of action.

=== Admiration for Custer ===
Criticism of Custer was not universal. While investigating the battlefield, Lieutenant General Nelson A. Miles wrote in 1877, "The more I study the moves here [on the Little Big Horn], the more I have admiration for Custer." Facing major budget cutbacks, the U.S. Army wanted to avoid bad press and found ways to exculpate Custer. They blamed the defeat on the Indians' alleged possession of numerous repeating rifles and the overwhelming numerical superiority of the warriors. (Note: Twenty-three men were called to testify at the inquiry, which met in session daily except Sundays. For the army, far more was at stake than individual reputations, as the future of the service could be affected. On January 2, General Sheridan had quoted Lee's report of agent malfeasance in a supplement to his annual report, which continued the General's running battle with the Bureau of Indian Affairs and the Department of the Interior. At the same time, a House committee was busy debating a new appropriations bill that required a major reorganization of the army. "Reduction of expenses" was emphasized. One proposal would lop off entire regiments, including two cavalry regiments. Another would set the line officers (those in the field) from Major down back a few years in the promotion schedule. The total reduction in officers was proposed to be 406, almost 25 percent of the total. The military strongly wanted to avoid confirmation of incompetency or cowardice—rumors of which were circulating around the impending court of inquiry in Chicago. Donovan (2008). A Terrible Glory (Kindle Locations 6395–6403))

The widowed Elizabeth Bacon Custer, who never remarried, wrote three popular books in which she fiercely protected her husband's reputation. (Note: Libbie Custer "spent almost sixty years commemorating her marriage—and her memories of it quite literally kept her alive....she was quintessentially the professional widow, forcing it to become a very touchy matter for any military writer or officer to criticize Custer for having insanely launched an attack without taking the most elementary precautions or making even an attempt at reconnaissance. To say or write such put one in the position of standing against bereaved Libbie". Smith, Gene (1993) op cit.) She lived until 1933, hindering much serious research until most of the evidence was long gone. In addition, Captain Frederick Whittaker's 1876 book idealizing Custer was hugely successful. Custer as a heroic officer fighting valiantly against savage forces was an image popularized in Wild West extravaganzas hosted by showman "Buffalo Bill" Cody, Pawnee Bill, and others. It was not until over half a century later that historians took another look at the battle and Custer's decisions that led to his death and loss of half his command and found much to criticize.

=== Gatling gun controversy ===
General Alfred Terry's Dakota column included a single battery of artillery, comprising two 3-inch ordnance rifles and two Gatling guns. (Note: Terry's column out of Fort Abraham Lincoln included "...artillery (two Rodman and two Gatling guns)...") (Note: "[Three] rapid-fire artillery pieces known as Gatling guns" were part of Terry's firepower included in the Dakota column.) (According to historian Evan S. Connell, the precise number of Gatlings has not been established: either two or three.) (Note: "How many Gatling guns lurched across the prairie is uncertain. Probably three.")

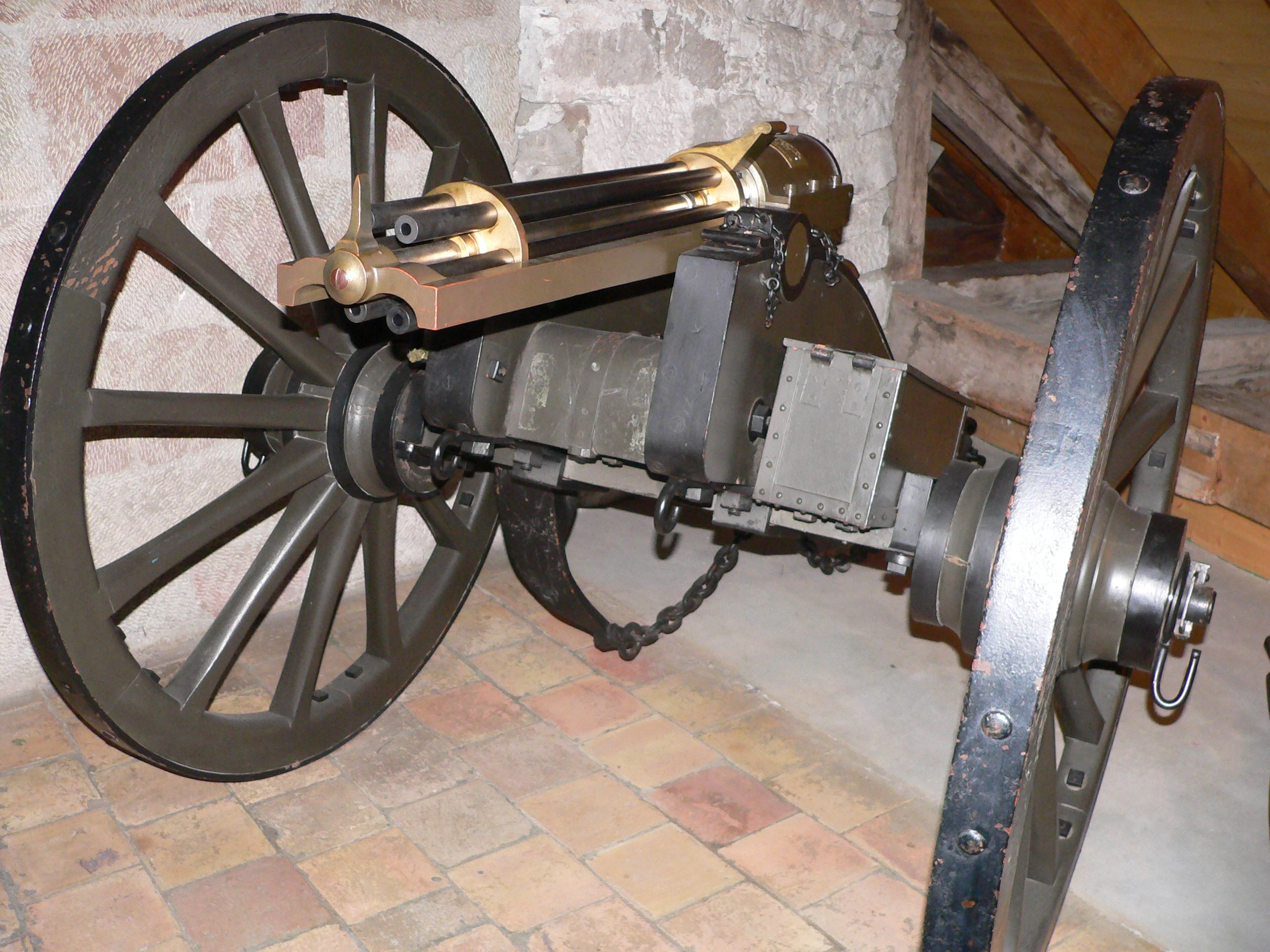
The Gatling gun, invented in 1861 by Richard Gatling. Custer declined an offer of a battery of these weapons, explaining to Terry that they would "hamper our movements". Said Custer, "The Seventh can handle anything it meets."

Custer's decision to reject Terry's offer of the rapid-fire Gatlings has raised questions among historians as to why he refused them and what advantage their availability might have conferred on his forces at the Battle of the Little Bighorn. (Note: "Custer refused Terry's offer of the Gatling gun battery." "Military historians have speculated whether this decision was a mistake. If Gatling guns had made it to the battlefield, they might have allowed Custer enough firepower to allow Custer's companies to survive on Last Stand Hill." "Since its invention during the Civil War, the Gatling gun had been used sparingly in actual battle, but there was no denying, potentially at least, an awesome weapon.")

One factor concerned Major Marcus Reno's recent 8-day reconnaissance-in-force of the Powder-Tongue-Rosebud Rivers, June 10 to 18. (Note: Reno's wing "left...on June 10...accompanied by a Gatling gun and its crew...") This deployment had demonstrated that artillery pieces mounted on gun carriages and hauled by horses no longer fit for cavalry mounts (so-called condemned horses) were cumbersome over mixed terrain and vulnerable to breakdowns. Custer, valuing the mobility of the 7th Cavalry and recognizing Terry's acknowledgment of the regiment as "the primary strike force" preferred to remain unencumbered by the Gatling guns. Custer insisted that the artillery was superfluous to his success, in that the 7th Cavalry alone was sufficient to cope with any force they should encounter, informing Terry: "The 7th can handle anything it meets". In addition to these practical concerns, a strained relationship with Major James Brisbin induced Custer's polite refusal to integrate Brisbin's Second Cavalry unit—and the Gatling guns—into his strike force, as it would disrupt any hierarchical arrangements that Custer presided over.

Historians have acknowledged the firepower inherent in the Gatling gun: they were capable of firing 350 .45–70 (11 mm) caliber rounds per minute. Jamming caused by black powder residue could lower that rate, raising questions as to their reliability under combat conditions. Researchers have further questioned the effectiveness of the guns under the tactics that Custer was likely to face with the Lakota and Cheyenne warriors. The Gatlings, mounted high on carriages, required the battery crew to stand upright during its operation, making them easy targets for Lakota and Cheyenne sharpshooters.

Historian Robert M. Utley, in a section entitled "Would Gatling Guns Have Saved Custer?" presents two judgments from Custer's contemporaries: General Henry J. Hunt, expert in the tactical use of artillery in Civil War, stated that Gatlings "would probably have saved the command", whereas General Nelson A. Miles, participant in the Great Sioux War declared "[Gatlings] were useless for Indian fighting."

== Weapons ==
=== Lakota and Cheyenne ===
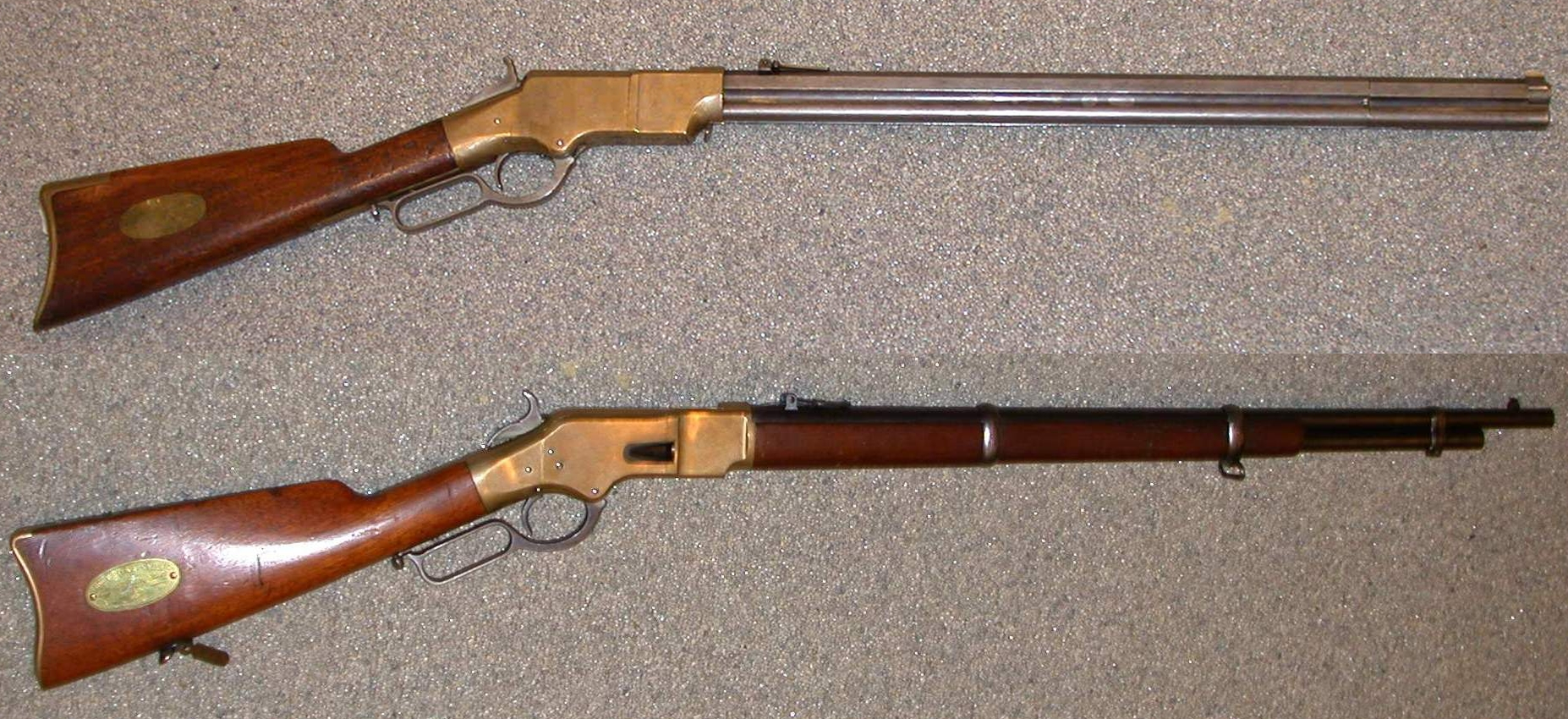
Henry rifle and a Winchester Model 1866 rifle. These repeater rifles were capable of higher rates of fire than the Springfield trapdoor.

The Lakota and Cheyenne warriors that opposed Custer's forces possessed a wide array of weaponry, from war clubs and lances to the most advanced firearms of the day. The typical firearms carried by the Lakota and Cheyenne combatants were muzzleloaders, more often a cap-lock smoothbore, the so-called Indian trade musket or Leman guns distributed to Indians by the US government at treaty conventions. Less common were surplus rifled muskets of American Civil War vintage such as the Pattern 1853 Enfield and Springfield Model 1861. Metal cartridge weapons were prized by native combatants, such as the Henry and the Spencer lever-action rifles, as well as Sharps breechloaders. The Lakota and Cheyenne warriors also used bows and arrows. Effective up to 30 yards (27 meters), the arrows could readily maim or disable an opponent.

Sitting Bull's forces had no assured means to supply themselves with firearms and ammunition. Nonetheless, they could usually procure these through post-traders, licensed or unlicensed, and from gunrunners who operated in the Dakota Territory: "a horse or a mule for a repeater ... buffalo hides for ammunition." Custer's highly regarded guide, "Lonesome" Charley Reynolds, informed his superior in early 1876 that Sitting Bull's forces were amassing weapons, including numerous Winchester repeating rifles and abundant ammunition.

Of the guns owned by Lakota and Cheyenne fighters at the Little Bighorn, approximately 200 were .44 caliber Winchester Model 1866 repeating rifles, corresponding to about 1 of 10 of the encampment's 2,000 able-bodied fighters who participated in the battle.

=== 7th Cavalry ===
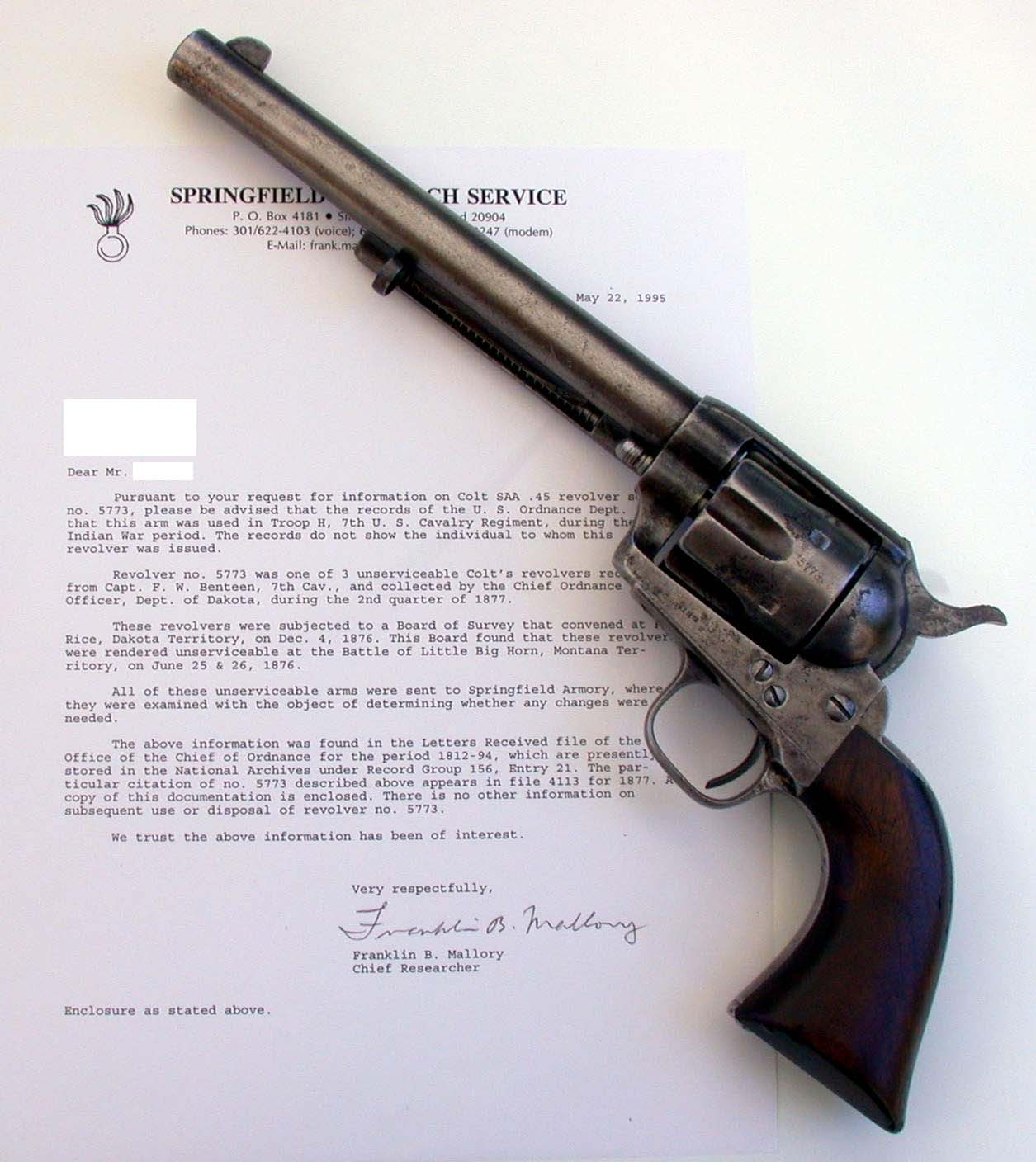
Colt Single Action Army, serial No 5773 7th Cavalry issued

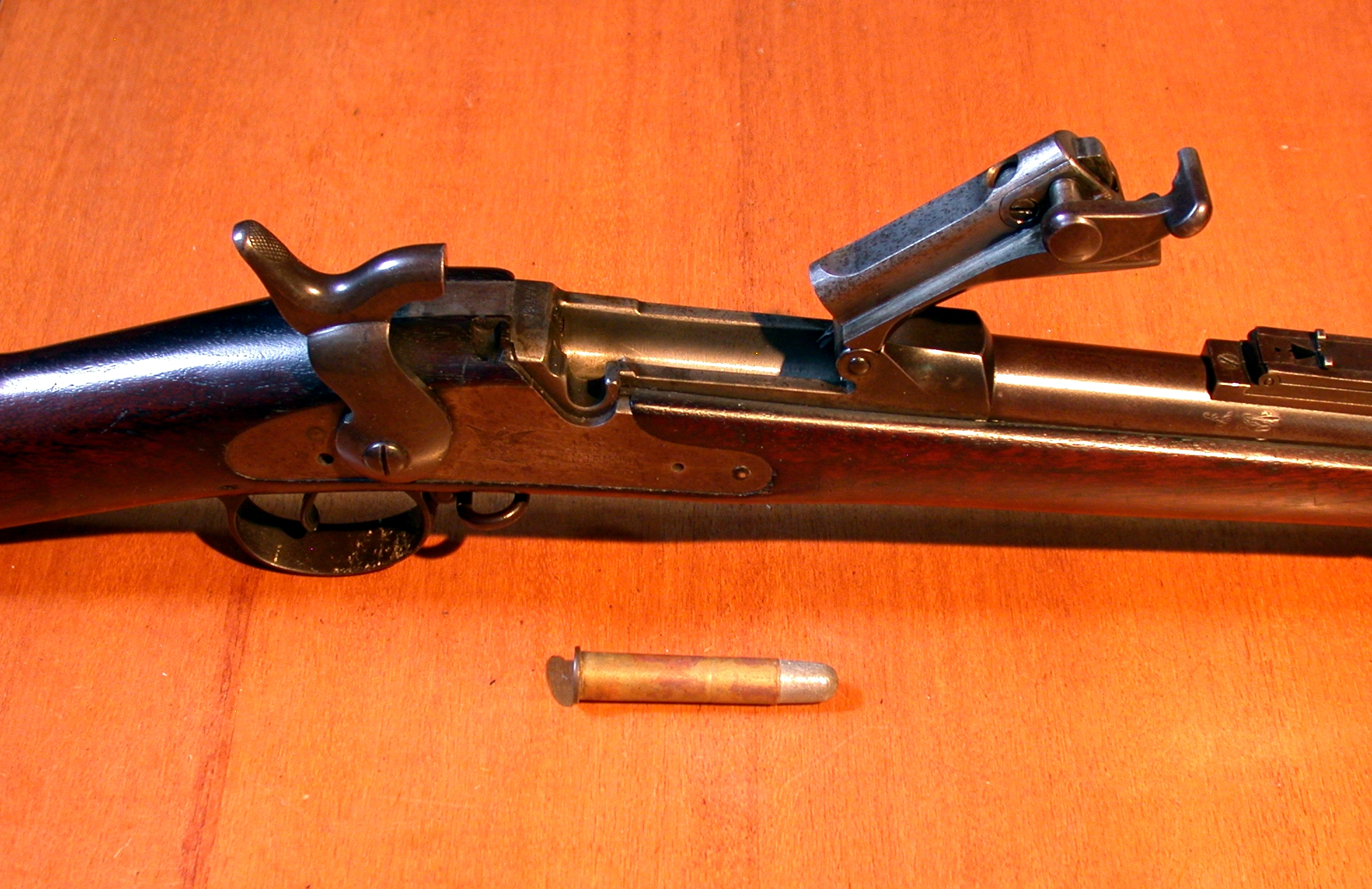
Springfield trapdoor rifle with breech open. Custer's troopers were equipped with these breech-loading, single-shot rifles.

The troops under Custer's command carried two regulation firearms authorized and issued by the U.S. Army in early 1876: the breech-loading single-shot Springfield Model 1873 carbine and the 1873 Colt single-action revolver. The regulation Model 1860 saber or "long knives" were not carried by troopers upon Custer's order.

Except for a number of officers and scouts who opted for personally owned and more expensive rifles and handguns, the 7th Cavalry was uniformly armed.

Ammunition allotments provided 100 carbine rounds per trooper, carried on a cartridge belt and in saddlebags on their mounts. An additional 50 carbine rounds per man were reserved on the pack train that accompanied the regiment to the battlefield. Each trooper had 24 rounds for his Colt handgun.

The opposing forces, though not equally matched in the number and type of arms, were comparably outfitted, and neither side held an overwhelming advantage in weaponry.

=== Lever-action repeaters vs. single-shot breechloaders ===
Two hundred or more Lakota and Cheyenne combatants are known to have been armed with Henry, Winchester, or similar lever-action repeating rifles at the battle. Virtually every trooper in the 7th Cavalry fought with the single-shot breech-loading Springfield carbine and the Colt revolver.

Historians have asked whether the repeating rifles conferred a distinct advantage on Sitting Bull's villagers that contributed to their victory over Custer's carbine-armed soldiers.

Historian Michael L. Lawson offers a scenario based on archaeological collections at the "Henryville" site, which yielded plentiful Henry rifle cartridge casings from approximately 20 individual guns. Lawson speculates that though less powerful than the Springfield carbines, the Henry repeaters provided a barrage of fire at a critical point, driving Lieutenant James Calhoun's L Company from Calhoun Hill and Finley Ridge, forcing it to flee in disarray back to Captain Myles Keogh's I Company and leading to the disintegration of that wing of Custer's Battalion.

==== Model 1873 / 1884 Springfield carbine and the U.S. Army ====
After exhaustive testing—including comparisons to domestic and foreign single-shot and repeating rifles—the Army Ordnance Board (whose members included officers Marcus Reno and Alfred Terry) authorized the Springfield as the official firearm for the United States Army.

The Springfield, manufactured in a .45–70 long rifle version for the infantry and a .45–55 light carbine version for the cavalry, was judged a solid firearm that met the long-term and geostrategic requirements of the United States fighting forces.

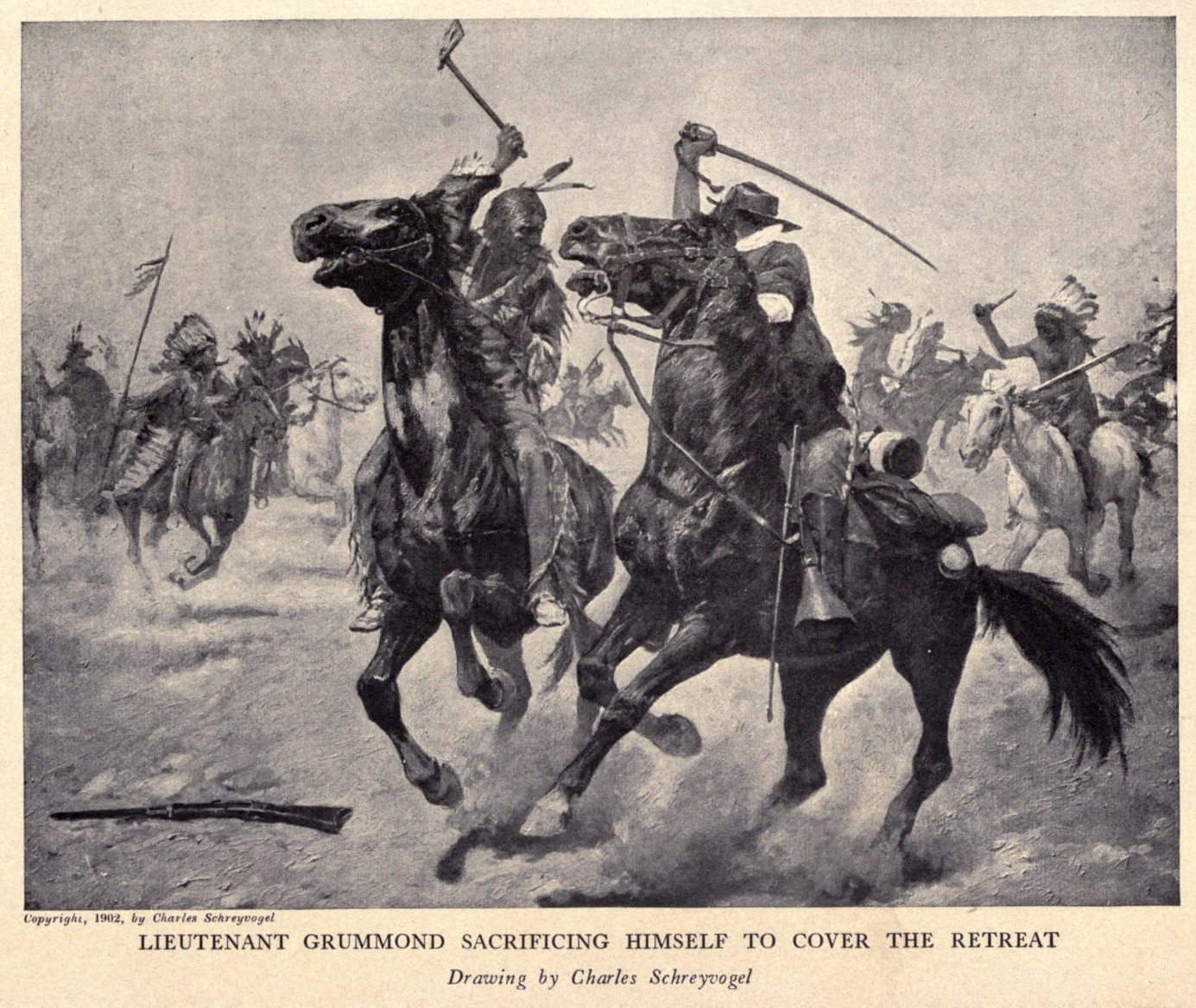
Tomahawk and sabre; or even odds, painting by Charles Schreyvogel (1861–1912). This kind of combat never occurred at the Battle of the Little Bighorn: none of the 7th Cavalry carried sabers on Custer's orders.

Historian Mark Gallear claims that U.S. government experts rejected the lever-action repeater designs, deeming them ineffective in a clash with fully equipped European armies, or in case of an outbreak of another civil conflict. Gallear's analysis dismisses the allegation that rapid depletion of ammunition in lever-action models influenced the decision in favor of the single-shot Springfield. The Indian Wars are portrayed by Gallear as a minor theatre of conflict whose contingencies were unlikely to govern the selection of standard weaponry for an emerging industrialized nation.

The Springfield carbine is praised for its "superior range and stopping power" by historian James Donovan, and author Charles M. Robinson reports that the rifle could be "loaded and fired much more rapidly than its muzzle-loading predecessors, and had twice the range of repeating rifles such as the Winchester, Henry and Spencer."

Gallear points out that lever-action rifles, after a burst of rapid discharge, still required a reloading interlude that lowered their overall rate of fire; Springfield breechloaders "in the long run, had a higher rate of fire, which was sustainable throughout a battle."

The breechloader design patent for the Springfield's Erskine S. Allin trapdoor system was owned by the US government and the firearm could be easily adapted for production with existing machinery at the Springfield Armory in Massachusetts. At time when funding for the post-war Army had been slashed, the prospect for economical production influenced the Ordnance Board member selection of the Springfield option.

==== Malfunction of the Springfield carbine extractor mechanism ====
Whether the reported malfunction of the Model 1873 Springfield carbine issued to the 7th Cavalry contributed to their defeat has been debated for years.

That the weapon experienced jamming of the extractor is not contested, but its contribution to Custer's defeat is considered negligible. This conclusion is supported by evidence from archaeological studies performed at the battlefield, where the recovery of Springfield cartridge casing, bearing tell-tale scratch marks indicating manual extraction, were rare. The flaw in the ejector mechanism was known to the Army Ordnance Board at the time of the selection of the Model 1873 rifle and carbine, and was not considered a significant shortcoming in the overall worthiness of the shoulder arm. With the ejector failure in US Army tests as low as 1:300, the Springfield carbine was vastly more reliable than the muzzle-loading Springfields used in the Civil War.

Gallear addresses the post-battle testimony concerning the copper .45–55 cartridges supplied to the troops in which an officer is said to have cleared the chambers of spent cartridges for a number of Springfield carbines. This testimony of widespread fusing of the casings offered to the Chief of Ordnance at the Reno Court of Inquiry in 1879 conflicts with the archaeological evidence collected at the battlefield. Field data showed that possible extractor failures occurred at a rate of approximately 1:30 firings at the Custer Battlefield and at a rate of 1:37 at the Reno-Benteen Battlefield.

Historian Thom Hatch observes that the Model 1873 Springfield, despite the known ejector flaw, remained the standard issue shoulder arm for US troops until the early 1890s.

== Survivor claims ==
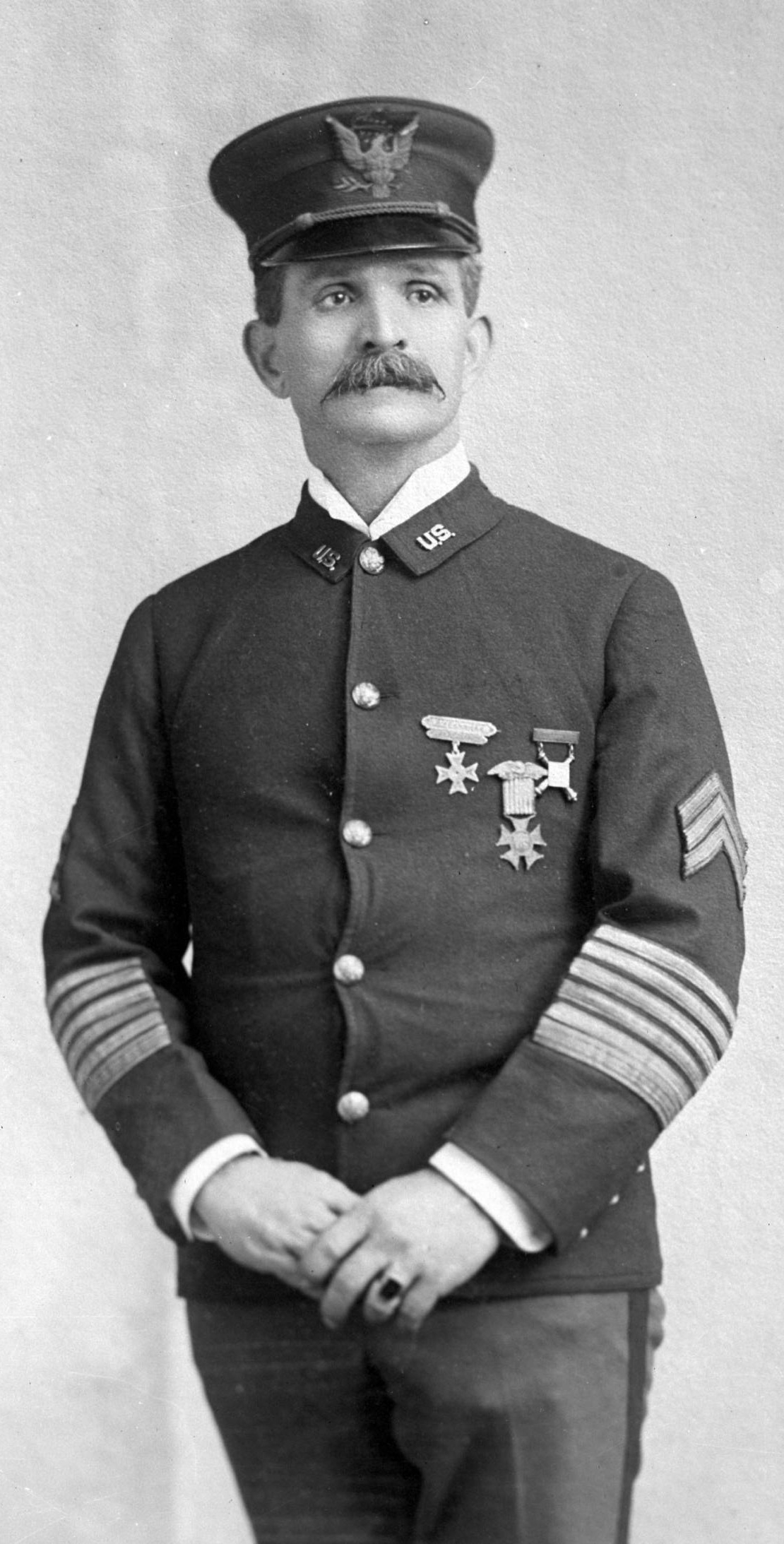
Giovanni Martino wearing the US Army uniform, c. 1904

Soldiers under Custer's direct command were annihilated on the first day of the battle, except for three Crow scouts and several troopers (including John Martin (Giovanni Martino) and Sergeant Daniel A. Kanipe, both of whom were used by Custer as messengers) who had left that column before the battle; one Crow scout, Curly, was the only survivor to leave after the battle had begun. Rumors of other survivors persisted for years. (Note: Graham, 146. Lt Edward Godfrey reported finding a dead 7th Cavalry horse (shot in the head), a grain sack, and a carbine at the mouth of the Rosebud River. He conjectured that a soldier had escaped Custer's fight and rafted across the river, abandoning his played-out horse.)

Over 120 men and women came forward over the next 70 years claiming they were "the lone survivor" of Custer's Last Stand. The phenomenon became so widespread that one historian remarked, "Had Custer had all of those who claimed to be 'the lone survivor' of his two battalions he would have had at least a brigade behind him when he crossed the Wolf Mountains and rode to the attack."

The historian Earl Alonzo Brininstool suggested he had collected at least 70 "lone survivor" stories. Michael Nunnally, an amateur Custer historian, wrote a booklet describing 30 such accounts. W. A. Graham claimed that even Libby Custer received dozens of letters from men, in shocking detail, about their sole survivor experience. At least 125 alleged "single survivor" tales have been noted in the historical record as of July 2012.

Frank Finkel, from Dayton, Washington, apparently had a story so convincing that historian Charles Kuhlman believed the alleged survivor, going so far as to write a lengthy defense of Finkel's participation in the battle. Douglas Ellison—mayor of Medora, North Dakota, and an amateur historian—also wrote a book in support of the veracity of Finkel's claim, but most scholars reject it.

Some of these supposed survivors held a form of celebrity status in the United States, among them Raymond Hatfield "Arizona Bill" Gardner and Frank Tarbeaux. A few even published autobiographies that detailed their deeds at the Little Bighorn.

A modern historian, Albert Winkler, has asserted that there is some evidence to support the claim of Private Gustave Korn being a genuine survivor of the battle: "While nearly all of the accounts of men who claimed to be survivors from Custer's column at the Battle of the Little Bighorn are fictitious, Gustave Korn's story is supported by contemporary records." Several contemporary accounts note that Korn's horse bolted in the early stages of the battle whilst he was serving with Custer's 'I' company and that he subsequently joined Reno's companies making their stand on Reno Hill.

Almost as soon as men came forward implying or directly pronouncing their unique role in the battle, there were others who were equally opposed to any such claims. Theodore W. Goldin, a battle participant who later became a controversial historian on the event, wrote (in regards to Charles Hayward's claim to have been with Custer and taken prisoner):

The Indians always insisted that they took no prisoners. If they did—a thing I firmly believe—they were tortured and killed the night of the 25th. As an evidence of this I recall the three charred and burned heads we picked up in the village near the scene of the big war dance, when we visited the village with Capt. Benteen and Lieut. Wallace on the morning of the 27th ... I'm sorely afraid, Tony, that we will have to class Hayward's story, like that of so many others, as pure, unadulterated B. S. As a clerk at headquarters I had occasion to look over the morning reports of at least the six troops at Lincoln almost daily, and never saw his name there, or among the list of scouts employed from time to time ... I am hoping that some day all of these damned fakers will die and it will be safe for actual participants in the battle to admit and insist that they were there, without being branded and looked upon as a lot of damned liars. Actually, there have been times when I have been tempted to deny that I ever heard of the 7th Cavalry, much less participated with it in that engagement ... My Medal of Honor and its inscription have served me as proof positive that I was at least in the vicinity at the time in question, otherwise I should be tempted to deny all knowledge of the event.

The only documented and verified survivor of Custer's command (having been actually involved in Custer's part of the battle) was Captain Keogh's horse, Comanche. The wounded horse was discovered on the battlefield by General Terry's troops. Although other cavalry mounts survived, they had been taken by the Indians. Comanche eventually was returned to the fort and became the regimental mascot. (Note: Badly wounded, the horse had been overlooked or left behind by the victors, who had taken the other surviving horses. Comanche was taken back to the steamer Far West and returned to Fort Abraham Lincoln to be nursed back to health.) Several other badly wounded horses were found and killed at the scene. Writer Evan S. Connell noted in Son of the Morning Star:

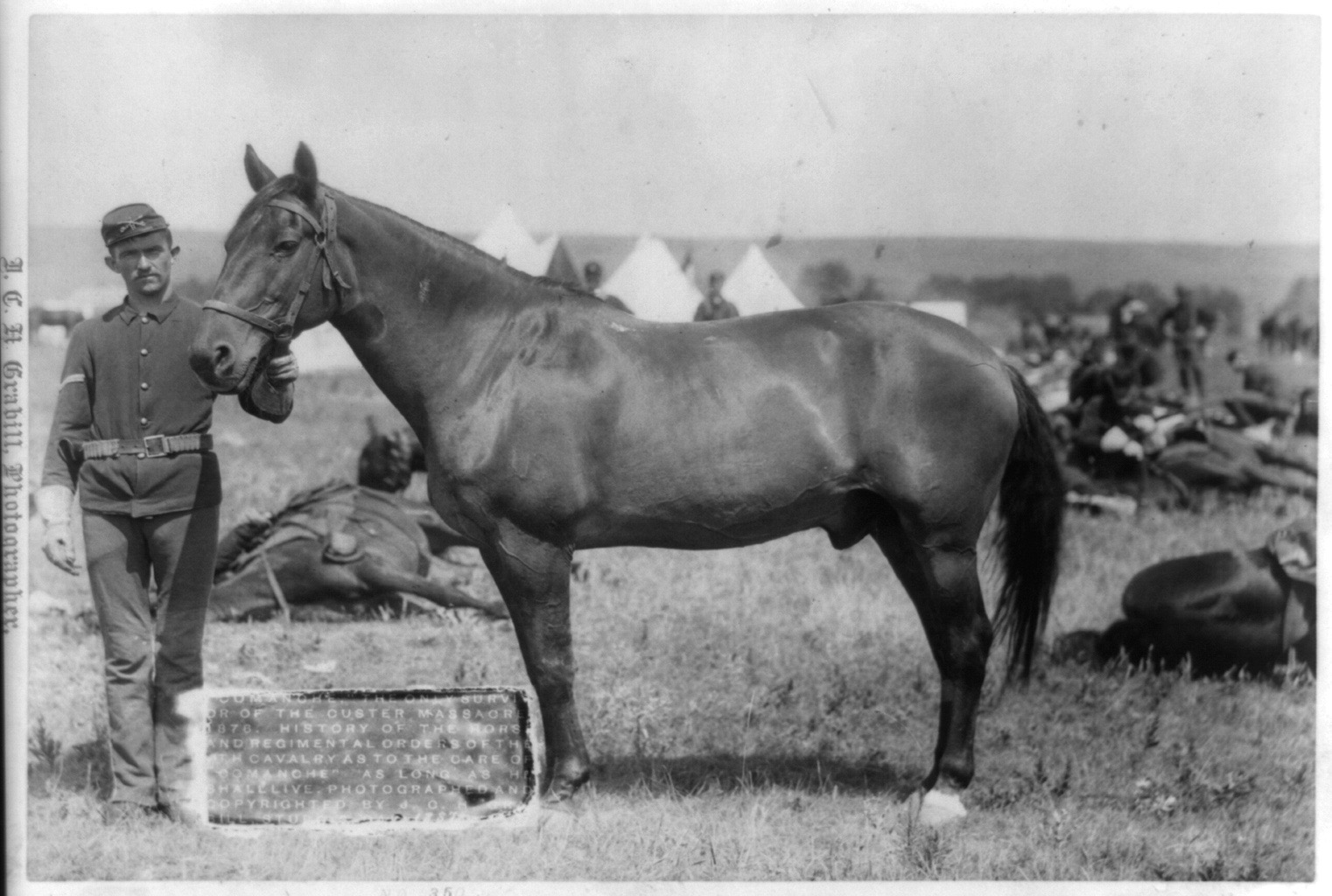
Comanche in 1887

Comanche was reputed to be the only survivor of the Little Bighorn, but quite a few Seventh Cavalry mounts survived, probably more than one hundred, and there was even a yellow bulldog. Comanche lived on another fifteen years. When he died, he was stuffed and to this day remains in a glass case at the University of Kansas. So, protected from moths and souvenir hunters by his humidity-controlled glass case, Comanche stands patiently, enduring generation after generation of undergraduate jokes. The other horses are gone, and the mysterious yellow bulldog is gone, which means that in a sense the legend is true. Comanche alone survived.

== Battlefield preservation ==
The site of the battle was first preserved as a United States national cemetery in 1879 to protect the graves of the 7th Cavalry troopers. In 1946, it was re-designated as the Custer Battlefield National Monument, reflecting its association with Custer. In 1967, Major Marcus Reno was re-interred in the cemetery with honors, including an eleven-gun salute. Beginning in the early 1970s, there was concern within the National Park Service over the name Custer Battlefield National Monument failing to adequately reflect the larger history of the battle between two cultures. Hearings on the name change were held in Billings on June 10, 1991, and during the following months Congress renamed the site the Little Bighorn Battlefield National Monument.

United States memorialization of the battlefield began in 1879 with a temporary monument to the U.S. dead. In 1881, the current marble obelisk was erected in their honor. In 1890, marble blocks were added to mark the places where the U.S. cavalry soldiers fell.

Nearly 100 years later, ideas about the meaning of the battle became more inclusive. The United States government acknowledged that Native American sacrifices also deserved recognition at the site. The 1991 bill changing the name of the national monument also authorized an Indian Memorial to be built near Last Stand Hill in honor of Lakota and Cheyenne warriors. The commissioned work by native artist Colleen Cutschall is shown in the photograph at right. On Memorial Day 1999, in consultation with tribal representatives, the U.S. added two red granite markers to the battlefield to note where Native American warriors fell. As of December 2006, a total of ten warrior markers have been added (three at the Reno–Benteen Defense Site and seven on the Little Bighorn Battlefield).

The Indian Memorial, themed "Peace Through Unity", is an open circular structure that stands 75 yards (69 metres) from the 7th Cavalry obelisk. Its walls have the names of some Indians who died at the site, as well as native accounts of the battle. The open circle of the structure is symbolic, as for many tribes, the circle is sacred. The "spirit gate" window facing the Cavalry monument is symbolic as well, welcoming the dead cavalrymen into the memorial.

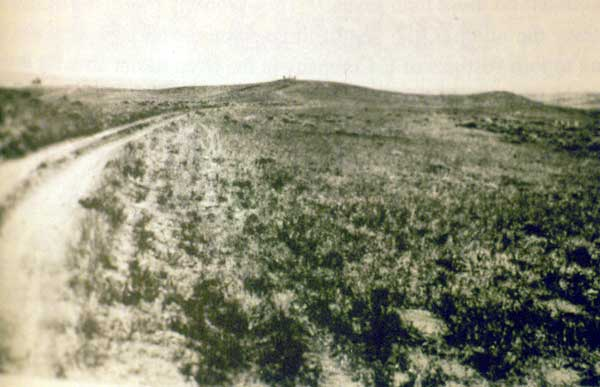
Photo taken in 1894 by H.R. Locke on Battle Ridge looking toward Last Stand Hill (top center). To the right of Custer Hill is Wooden Leg Hill, named for a surviving warrior. He described the death of a Sioux sharpshooter killed after being seen too often by the enemy.

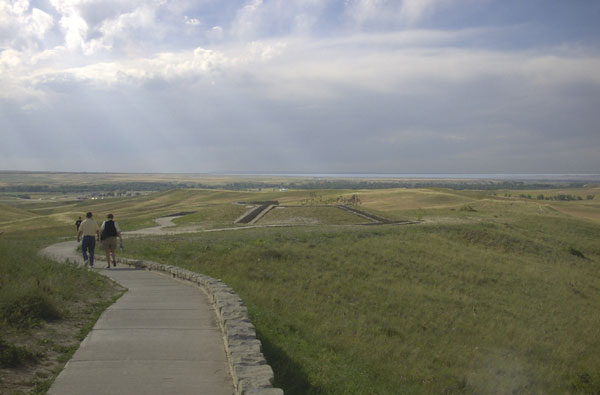
The battlefield in 2005

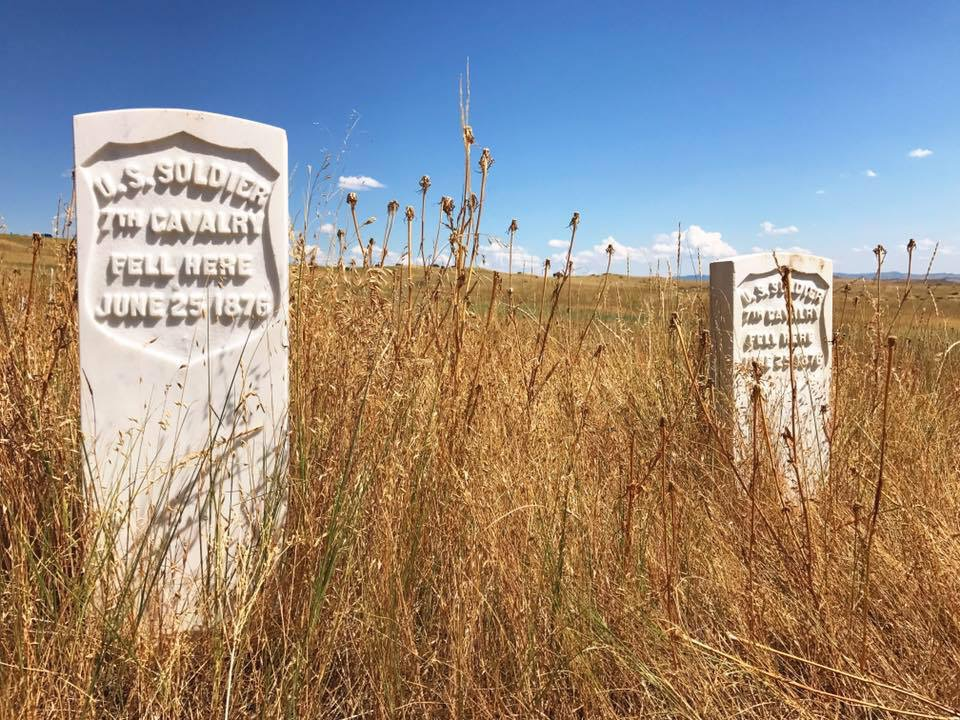
US Casualty Marker Battle of the Little Bighorn

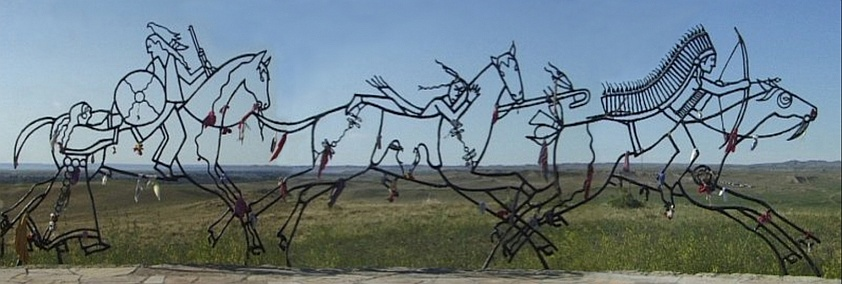
Indian Memorial by Colleen Cutschall

== In popular culture ==
- John Mulvany's 1881 painting Custer's Last Rally was the first of the large images of this battle. It was 11 by 20 feet (3.4 by 6.1 m) and toured the country for over 17 years.
- In 1896, Anheuser-Busch commissioned from Otto Becker a lithographed modified version of Cassilly Adams' painting Custer's Last Fight, which was distributed as a print to saloons all over America.
- Edgar Samuel Paxson completed his painting Custer's Last Stand in 1899. In 1963 Harold McCracken, the noted historian and Western art authority, deemed Paxson's painting "the best pictoral representation of the battle" and "from a purely artistic standpoint...one of the best if not the finest pictures which have been created to immortalize that dramatic event."
- In 1926, General Custer at the Little Big Horn opened in movie theaters in the U.S., featuring Roy Stewart with John Beck as Custer.
- The 1941 film They Died with Their Boots On, starring Errol Flynn, Olivia de Havilland, Arthur Kennedy, Anthony Quinn and Sydney Greenstreet, is a fictionalized, romanticized drama of Custer's life beginning with his time at West Point and concluding with the battle.
- The episode The 7th Is Made Up of Phantoms from the fifth season of the American television anthology series The Twilight Zone depicts modern American soldiers finding themselves near the battlefield and ultimately involved in the real battle.
- The 1964 novel Little Big Man by American author Thomas Berger and 1970 film of the same name include an account of the battle and portray a manic and somewhat psychotic Custer (Richard Mulligan) realizing to his horror that he and his command are "being wiped out."
- The 1972 John Wayne movie The Cowboys includes a scene where his cattle drive passes through the battlefield some years later, and the drovers find skeletal remains. Wayne's character, Wil Andersen, in a response to a question from one of the young drovers regarding the deceased having not been buried replies, "Well, it's not how you're buried, it's how they remember you".
- The 1982 novel Flashman and the Redskins by George MacDonald Fraser has a fictionalized account of the battle and some of the main participants including Custer and Native American leaders.
- 1991 TV miniseries Son of the Morning Star was based on the life of Lt. Col. George A. Custer and the 7th Cavalry. It concludes with the Battle of Little Bighorn, where 5 companies of the 7th Cavalry are wiped out, along with George Custer, Thomas Custer, Boston Custer and the brothers' nephew Henry A. "Autie" Reed.
- The 1994 video game Live A Live features this story in its Western chapter. The chapter villain O. Dio was actually the horse that was the sole survivor of the battle; possession by vengeful spirits of the slain Union soldiers turned the horse into an evil man, as told by the town sheriff after defeating O. Dio.
- A fictionalized version of the battle is depicted in the 2006 video game Age of Empires III: The Warchiefs.
- In 2007, the BBC presented a one-hour drama-documentary titled Custer's Last Stand.
- The May 2011 episode of the BBC Radio 4 program In Our Time featured Melvyn Bragg (and guests) discussing the context, conditions, and consequences of the battle.
- In the 2012 Breaking Bad episode "Hazard Pay" (season 5, episode 3), Mike Ehrmantraut references Custer's Last Stand when discussing the risk of operating a methamphetamine laboratory near a police station.
- In 2017, historian Daniele Bolelli covered the battle and the events leading to it in a three-part series on the "History on Fire" podcast.
- In October 2024, the book The Ballad of Thomas Patrick Downing was released. This is the first biography of one of Custer's men in over a hundred years. It chronicles the life of one of Custer's previously anonymous cavalrymen, Thomas Patrick Downing from I Company, who died in the battle.

== See also ==
- Battle of the Little Bighorn reenactment
- Battle of Powder River
- Dade battle
- Fetterman Fight
- List of battles won by Indigenous peoples of the Americas
- St. Clair's Defeat
- Battle of Isandlwana
- Battle of Adwa

== Citations ==
=== References ===
- Barnard, Sandy (1998). Digging into Custer's Last Stand. Terre Haute, Indiana: AST Press. ISBN 0-9618087-5-6.
- Brininstool, E. A. (1994). Troopers With Custer. Mechanicsburg, Pennsylvania: Stackpole Books. ISBN 0-8117-1742-9.
- Connell, Evan S. (1984). Son of the Morning Star. New York: North Point Press. ISBN 0-86547-510-5.
- Cornut, David (2012). Little Big Horn: Autopsie d'une bataille légendaire. Parçay-sur-Vienne: Anovi. ISBN 978-2-360351-34-3.
- Dickson, Ephriam D. III. "Prisoners in the Indian Camp: Kill Eagle's Band at the Little Bighorn" (PDF). Greasy Grass. 27 (May 2011): 3–11. OCLC 38114524.
- Donovan, James (2008). A Terrible Glory: Custer and the Little Bighorn. Little, Brown, and Co. ISBN 978-0-316-15578-6.
- Dustin, Fred (1939). The Custer Tragedy: Events Leading Up to and Following the Little Big Horn Campaign of 1876. Ann Arbor, Michigan: Edwards Brothers. OCLC 4387990.
- Elliot, M.A. (2007). Custerology: The Enduring Legacy of the Indian Wars and George Armstrong Custer. University of Chicago Press. ISBN 978-0-226-20146-7.
- Flaherty, Thomas H., ed. (1993). The Wild West. New York: Time-Life Books. ISBN 0-446-51761-5.
- Gallear, Mark (2001). Guns at the Little Bighorn. Custer Association of Great Britain. Archived from the original on September 8, 2006.
- Goodrich, Thomas (1997). Scalp Dance: Indian Warfare on the High Plains, 1865–1879. Mechanicsburg, PA: Stackpole Books. ISBN 0-8117-1523-X.
- Graham, Col. William A. (1953). The Custer Myth: A Source Book for Custeriana. New York: Bonanza Books. OCLC 944258.
- Gray, John S. (1991). Custer's Last Campaign: Mitch Boyer and the Little Bighorn Reconstructed. Lincoln: University of Nebraska Press. ISBN 0-8032-7040-2.
- Hammer, Kenneth (2000). Nichols, Ronald H. (ed.). Men with Custer: Biographies of the 7th Cavalry: June 25, 1876. Hardin, Montana: Custer Battlefield Historical and Museum Association. ISBN 1-892258-05-6.
- Hammer, Kenneth, ed. (1976). Custer in '76: Walter Camp's notes on the Custer Fight. Provo: Brigham Young University. ISBN 0-8061-2279-X.
- Hardorff, R. G., ed. (1997). Camp, Custer and the Little Big Horn. El Segundo, California: Upton and Sons. ISBN 0-912783-25-7.
- Hardorff, R. G. (1993). Hokahey! A Good Day to Die! The Indian Casualties of the Custer Fight. University of Nebraska Press. ISBN 0-8032-7322-3.
- Hatch, Thom (1997). Custer and the Little Bighorn: An Encyclopedia. London: McFarland & Company, Inc. ISBN 0-7864-0154-0.
- Keegan, John (1996). Warpaths. London: Pimlico. ISBN 1-55013-621-6.
- Lawson, Michael L. (2007). Little Bighorn: Winning the Battle, Losing the War. New York: Chelsea House Publishers. ISBN 978-0-7910-9347-4.
- Michno, Gregory F. (1994). The Mystery of E Troop: Custer's Grey Horse Company at the Little Bighorn. Missoula, Montana: Mountain Press Publishing. ISBN 0-87842-304-4.
- Miller, David, H. (1985). Custer's Fall: The Native American Side of the Story. University of Nebraska Press. ISBN 0-452-01095-0.
- Nevin, David (1973). The Old West: Soldiers. New York: Time-Life Books.
- Nichols, Ronald H., ed. (1996). Reno Court of Inquiry. Hardin, Montana: Custer Battlefield Historical and Museum Association. OCLC 45499454.
- Perrett, Bryan (1993). Last Stand!: Famous Battles Against the Odds. London: Arms & Armour. ISBN 1-85409-188-3.
- Philbrick, Nathaniel (2010). The Last Stand: Custer, Sitting Bull, and The Battle of The Little Bighorn. Viking Press. ISBN 978-0-14-242769-9.
- Rice, Earle Jr. (1998). The Battle or the Little Bighorn. World History Series. San Diego: Lucent Books. ISBN 978-1-56006-453-4.
- Robinson, Charles M. III (1995). A Good Year to Die: the story of the great Sioux war. New York: Random House. ISBN 0-679-43025-3.
- Scott, Douglas D.; Connor, Melissa (1997). "Context Delicti: Archaeological Context in Forensic Work". In Haglund, W.D.; Sorg, M.H. (eds.). Forensic Taphonomy: The Postmortem Fate of Human Remains. Boca Raton: CRC Press. pp. 27–38. ISBN 978-0-8493-9434-8.
- Sklenar, Larry (2000). To Hell with Honor, General Custer and the Little Big Horn. Norman: University of Oklahoma Press. ISBN 0-8061-3472-0.
- Utley, Robert M. (1993). The Lance and the Shield: the life and times of Sitting Bull. New York: Henry Holt & Company. ISBN 0-8050-1274-5.
- Utley, Robert M. (2001). Cavalier in Buckskin: George Armstrong Custer and the Western Military Frontier (Revised ed.). Norman: University of Oklahoma Press. ISBN 0-8061-2292-7.
- Viola, Herman J. (1999). Little Bighorn Remembered: The Untold Indian Story of Custer's Last Stand. Westminster, Maryland: Times Books. ISBN 0-8129-3256-0.
- Welch, James; Stekler, Paul (1994). Killing Custer: The Battle of the Little Bighorn and the Fate of the Plains Indians. New York: Norton. ISBN 0-393-32939-9.
- Wert, Jeffry D. (1996). Custer: The Controversial Life of George Armstrong Custer. New York: Simon & Schuster. ISBN 0-684-81043-3.
