= Isaiah Dorman =

American slave

Isaiah Dorman (died June 25, 1876) was an interpreter for the United States Army during the Indian Wars. He perished at the Battle of Little Bighorn, the only black man killed in the fight.

== Early life and service with the US Army ==
Not much is known of Dorman's early life. Allegedly, his father was of Afro American descent and his mother was mixed African and Lenape. Date of births of both 1832 (in Philadelphia, as a freeman) and 1840 exist. Other records suggest that he was a slave in the 1840s in Louisiana to the D'Orman family and may have escaped and gone out West. By 1850, he had settled near Fort Rice in the Dakota Territory, where he supported himself by cutting wood for the garrison. He was on friendly terms with the Indians and probably knew Sitting Bull, according to Evan Connell's bestselling 1985 book Son of the Morning Star.

He lived with the Lakota tribe as a trapper and trader in the 1850s and married a young woman of Inkpaduta's band of the Santee Sioux named Celeste St. Pierre. His Dakota name was "Cetan Sapa", or Black Hawk. He was known to the Sioux as "Azimpi". There are no known photographs of him, and the only existing descriptions describe him as "very big" and "very black". An Indian pictograph of Reno's retreat shows a black man in Army uniform flat on the ground beside a prostrate white horse, with "an abnormally thick right thumb."

In November 1865, he was hired to carry the mail on a 360-mile (580 km) round trip between Forts Rice and Wadsworth for $100 (~$2,103 in 2025) a month - good pay at the time. It is said that he had no horse and walked the entire distance with his sleeping bag over his shoulder and the mail in a waterproof pouch. He did this for about two years.

In September 1871, he served as a guide and interpreter for a party of engineers making the Northern Pacific Railroad Survey. He may have accompanied the 7th Cavalry on the 1874 Black Hills Expedition; there are references to Custer's servant 'Isa', which may have been him mistaken by people who didn't know who he was.

== Dorman during the Battle of the Little Bighorn ==
In the late spring of 1876, George Armstrong Custer hired Dorman as an interpreter for his expedition to the Little Bighorn Country. (At least one report says that Dorman had not started out with the rest of the Montana Column, but had caught up with it at the Rosebud with a message and when he attempted to return to Fort Lincoln, Custer ordered him to remain. However, Custer's request for his assignment still exists and is dated May 14.)

On June 25, 1876, Dorman accompanied the detachment of Major Marcus Reno into the battle and was left behind when Reno retired across the river to the high bluffs. According to most accounts as in Connell (1985), he gave a good account of himself- shooting several braves with a non-regulation sporting rifle. According to the account of one Indian survivor of the battle:

We passed a black man in a soldier's uniform and we had him. He turned on his horse and shot an Indian right through the heart. Then the Indians fired at this one man and riddled his horse with bullets. His horse fell over on his back and the black man could not get up. I saw him as I rode by.

According to Connell 1985, white survivors tell a similar story. Dorman had been unhorsed but continued to fire at the Indians:

Pvt. Roman Rutten, unlike Vestal [Stanley Vestal; in reference to the story mentioned below], did fight at the Little Big Horn and his report of Isaiah's last stand rings through. Rutten was on a horse that hated the odor of Indians so his immediate problem was how to stay in the saddle. During a wild ride he passed Isiaih, whose horse had been shot. The black man was on one knee, firing carefully with a non-regulation sporting rifle. He looked up and shouted, "Goodbye, Rutten.

Other eyewitness accounts from survivors indicate that Dorman was tortured by a group of women who pounded him with stone hammers, slashed him repeatedly with knives, and shot his legs full of buckshot. One odd detail reported is that his coffee pot and cup were filled with blood. A report that he had been 'sliced open' may be a translator's error; near his body was that of one of the Ree (Arikara) scouts, which had been slashed open and a willow branch stuck in the opening. To the Indians, mutilations were characteristic of different tribes and particular marks meant certain things. As for the torture, the Indians considered him a traitor who had fought with the bluecoats against them.

A horrific 16"x2" strip of "leather" skin was cut from Dorman's body during the mutilation. It was then dried and kept for decades by the natives as a war trophy. Afraid of Lightening sold it to Eugene Burdick in 1932. His father and grandfather fought in the battle and are likely to be the harvesters of this morbid trophy. In 1986, Eugene donated it to the North Dakota State Museum where it still rests today in storage. See Other Sources below.

== Dorman and Sitting Bull ==
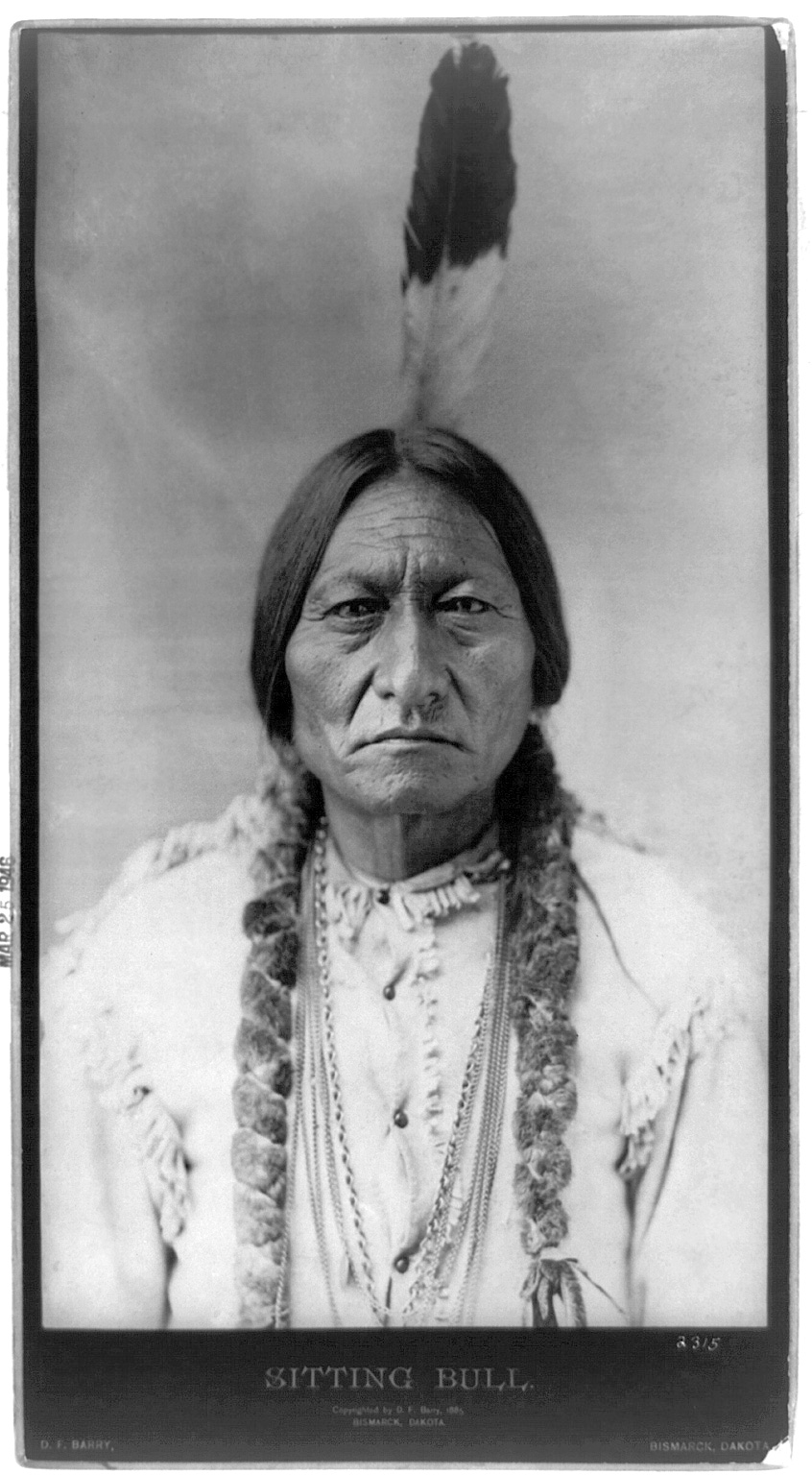
Sioux medicine man Sitting Bull reportedly offered Dorman a last drink of water on the battlefield.

Dorman's last stand at the Little Bighorn is documented in Stanley Vestal's Sitting Bull-Champion of the Sioux (Houghton Mifflin Company, Boston, 1932), "Isaiah Dorman and the Custer Expedition" by Ronald McConnell, Journal of Negro History, 33 (July 1948), and Troopers with Custer: Historic Incidents of the Battle of the Little Big Horn by E. A. Brininstool, 1925, 1989. Vestal relates that Dorman was shot and wounded by the Indians on the field of battle. The Sioux chief Sitting Bull recognized the black interpreter and stopped during the fighting to give him a last drink of water. According to Vestal:

The Negro asked for water and Sitting Bull took his cup of polished black buffalo horn, got some water and gave him to drink.

Connell holds that Dorman and Sitting Bull most likely knew each other, but doubts the veracity of the Sioux chief's drink offer, noting that similar stories of European style chivalry were common at the time. Some writers on Sitting Bull repeat the account as credible however, suggesting that it had little to do with sentimental notions of grand chivalry, but rather a practical gesture by the Sioux leader towards a doomed man. The water given and the 'stop order' was therefore a temporary reprieve, one last acknowledgement of the interpreter the medicine man had once personally known.

A 2008 biography of Sitting Bull by the prominent historian Robert Utley notes the incident in more detail. According to Utley, Dorman fell, badly wounded in the chest, and several warriors gathered around to finish the job. Dorman made a final plea in the Sioux language to "my friends", asking that they not count coup on him, since he was already dead. Sitting Bull rode up and said "Don't kill that man, he is a friend of mine." The Sioux leader then dismounted, poured water into a buffalo-horn cup and gave it to the black man. His obligation thus discharged, Sitting Bull mounted up once more, and rode on. Eagle Robe (Moving Robe Woman), a Hunkpapa woman scouring the battlefield, dispatched Dorman with a rifle shot, and others following mutilated the body. This was done so that the enemy would not look good in the spirit world. Whatever the exact details most writers agree that Dorman was friendly with the Indians, but this did not save him once the battle was joined.

== Aftermath ==
Dorman's body was found just out of the timber, near Charley Reynolds's and he was buried on the Reno Battlefield. It was reinterred in 1877 at Custer National Cemetery.

In Quartermaster Nowlan's official report on the 7th's 1876 Campaign, an item of $62.50 is listed as being owed to Dorman for services rendered in June 1876. A man named Isaac McNutt, who was a handyman at Ft Rice, attempted to claim the wages; but his claim was dismissed for lack of proof of connection. Dorman's Indian widow could not be found and the account may be still drawing interest somewhere in the Army bureaucracy.

== Depiction in Popular Culture ==
In the 1991 television mini-series on the American Broadcasting Company, Son of the Morning Star, a Black man is seen fighting under Marcus Reno's command. He is swarmed by Indians, killed, and scalped. This is in keeping with some accounts of Isaiah's death.

== Other sources ==
- Dorman biography
- Evan S. Connell; Son of the Morning Star, (1985)
- Ken Hammer, ed., Custer in '76: Walter Camp's Notes on the Custer Fight, Norman: University of Oklahoma, 1976.
- littlebighorn.info/Articles/LilahPengra/StripofSkin.pdf
