= Bloody Knife =

American army scout (c.1840–1876)

- Lakota: Tȟamila Wewe; Arikara: NeesiRAhpát
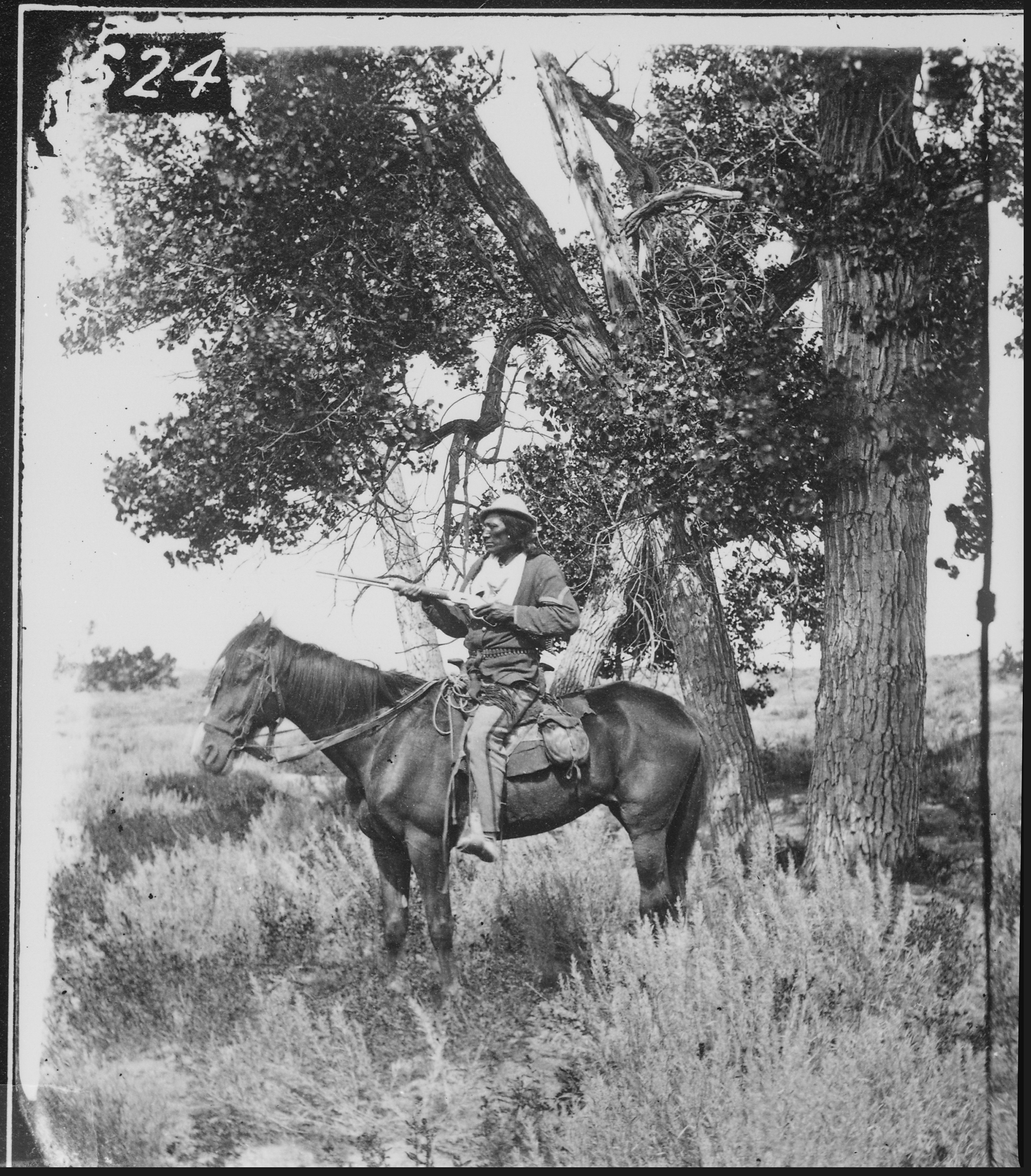
- Bloody Knife
- Born: ca. 1840; Dakota Territory
- Died: 25 June 1876 (aged 35–36); Montana Territory
- Burial place: Old Scouts Cemetery, White Shield, North Dakota
- Military career
- Allegiance: United States of America
- Branch: United States Army
- Service years: 1868–76
- Rank: Scout
- Unit: 7th U.S. Cavalry
- Conflicts: American Indian Wars: Battle of the Little Big Horn †

Bloody Knife (Lakota: Tȟamila Wewe; Arikara: NeesiRAhpát; ca. 1840 – June 25, 1876) was an American Indian who served as a scout and guide for the U.S. 7th Cavalry Regiment. He was the favorite scout of Lieutenant Colonel George Armstrong Custer and has been called "perhaps the most famous Native American scout to serve the U.S. Army."

Bloody Knife was born to a Hunkpapa Lakota father and an Arikara mother around 1840. He was abused and discriminated against by the other Sioux in his village because of his background, in particular by Gall, a future chief. When Bloody Knife was a teenager, he left his village with his mother to live with the Arikara tribe. His brothers were killed during a Sioux raid led by Gall in 1862. Bloody Knife found employment as a courier and hunter for the American Fur Company and later served under Alfred Sully before scouting for George Custer on several military expeditions. He died from a bullet wound to the head on June 25, 1876, during the Battle of the Little Bighorn.

== Early life ==
While his exact date and place of birth are unknown, Bloody Knife was born between 1837 and 1840. His father was a Hunkpapa Lakota and his mother a member of the Arikara tribe, also known as the Ree. Along with brothers and perhaps one sister, he lived with his father's tribe during his early childhood, but was not well-treated by them because of their enmity with his mother's people. Bloody Knife grew to hate the Sioux and especially a Lakota named Gall. Gall was the adopted brother of Sitting Bull, but while Sitting Bull had also mistreated Bloody Knife it was his peer with whom Bloody Knife developed an enduring feud. When Bloody Knife's mother left his father in 1856 to return to her own tribe, Bloody Knife joined her. About fifteen, he found himself on the Upper Missouri River at an American Fur Company trading post called Fort Clark.

Conflicts between the Arikaras and Sioux were routine there, with Sioux war parties attacking Arikaras who wandered too far from the fort. In spite of the threat they represented, Bloody Knife took on and succeeded in the dangerous job of delivering mail to other forts in Missouri and to Fort Totten in North Dakota. He did not, however, pass through these years unscathed. During a visit to his father, Bloody Knife was—contrary to the customary protection of guests—attacked and ambushed by Gall and several other Hunkpapas who beat him severely, stripped him, spat on him, mocked him and hit him with coup sticks and musket ramrods. In the fall of 1862, two of his brothers were killed, mutilated, and scalped by a Sioux war party led by Gall. Their bodies were left to be eaten by wolves.

== First years as a scout ==
After working for the American Fur Company, Bloody Knife accompanied Brigadier General Alfred Sully in 1865 as a scout on his Sioux expedition. Bloody Knife proved useful to the group of Galvanized Yankees, prisoner soldiers from the Confederate States Army who served the Union in the American West instead of serving time in a prisoner-of-war camp at Fort Berthold. He also worked as a messenger, helping the troops to communicate with other military units in the area, which was still mainly controlled by the Sioux. In late 1865, Bloody Knife met with Captain Adams Bassett of Company C, Fourth U.S. Volunteer Infantry, whom he told that Gall had recently arrived near Fort Berthold, that Gall was not peaceful and had killed white men along the Missouri River. Bassett sent a lieutenant with a platoon and Bloody Knife to capture Gall or kill him if he would not surrender. Bloody Knife led the soldiers to the Hunkpapa village, south of the fort where Gall was staying. The men attempted to arrest Gall upon arrival, but when Gall tried to escape he was bayoneted and forced to the ground, and was twice stabbed with bayonets. The story goes that Bloody Knife took aim to administer a killing shot to Gall's head, but the officer in command knocked the shot wide, claiming Gall was already dead. Bloody Knife argued furiously with the officer to no avail. He departed, leaving Gall alive to become a Lakota war chief. However, since similar stories have been told about Gall attempting to kill Sitting Bull and being prevented, the story may be apocryphal.

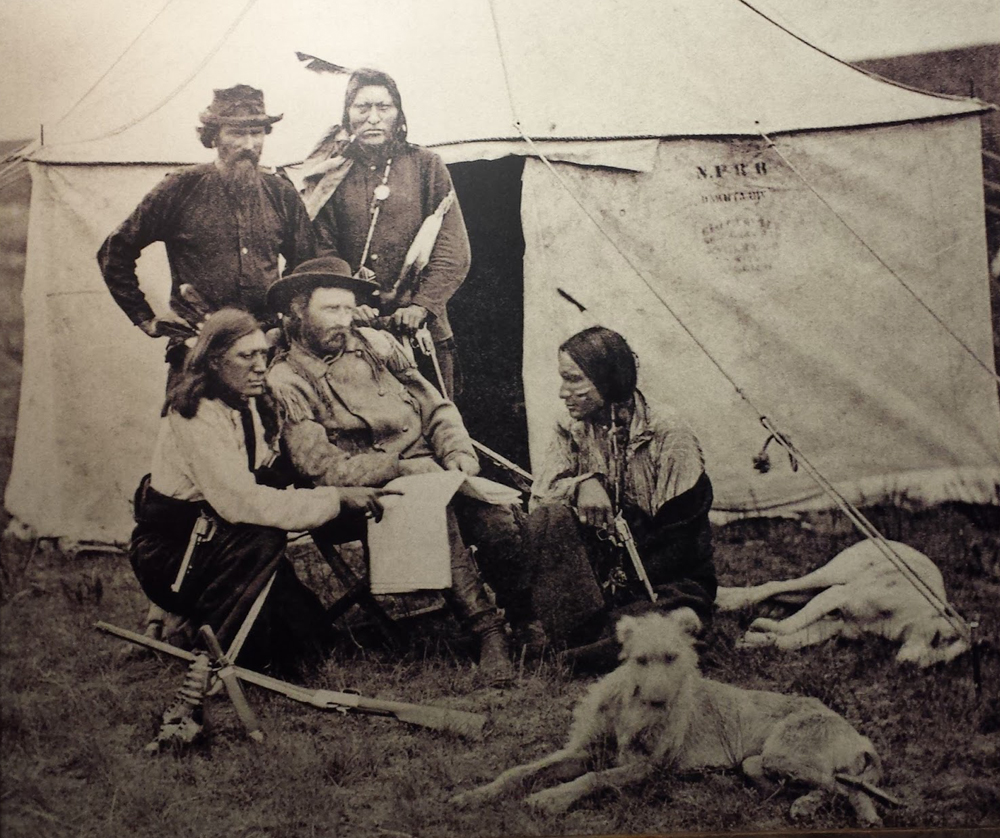
Pictured above, to the far left, kneeling is Bloody Knife next to George Custer, seated in the center

In 1866, President Andrew Johnson authorized the formation of a force of Indian scouts when he signed the Indian Scout Enlistment Act. Bloody Knife enlisted as a corporal at Fort Stevenson in May 1868, but his early service was not without issue. Bloody Knife had a problem with alcohol that may have led to him deserting his post in September 1868. By 1872, the year of his involvement in the Yellowstone Expedition, he became a lance corporal.

== Friendship and early work with Custer ==
In 1873, at Fort Rice, he met George Armstrong Custer. The two became friends, and Custer admired Bloody Knife's talents as a scout. Although Bloody Knife is said to have been insolent, Custer was amused by his candor. He was himself a volatile man, and during an expedition in 1874 would shoot at Bloody Knife during a fit of rage. Custer occasionally gave Bloody Knife gifts, including a silver medal inscribed with Bloody Knife's name that Custer ordered from Washington. Bloody Knife quickly became Custer's favorite scout. On the next Yellowstone Expedition, Bloody Knife joined Custer and fought against the Sioux. Bloody Knife helped to discover an abandoned Sioux village which he estimated to have held 1,000 warriors. The group followed the trail, which led them to a battle at Yellowstone.

== Black Hills Expedition ==
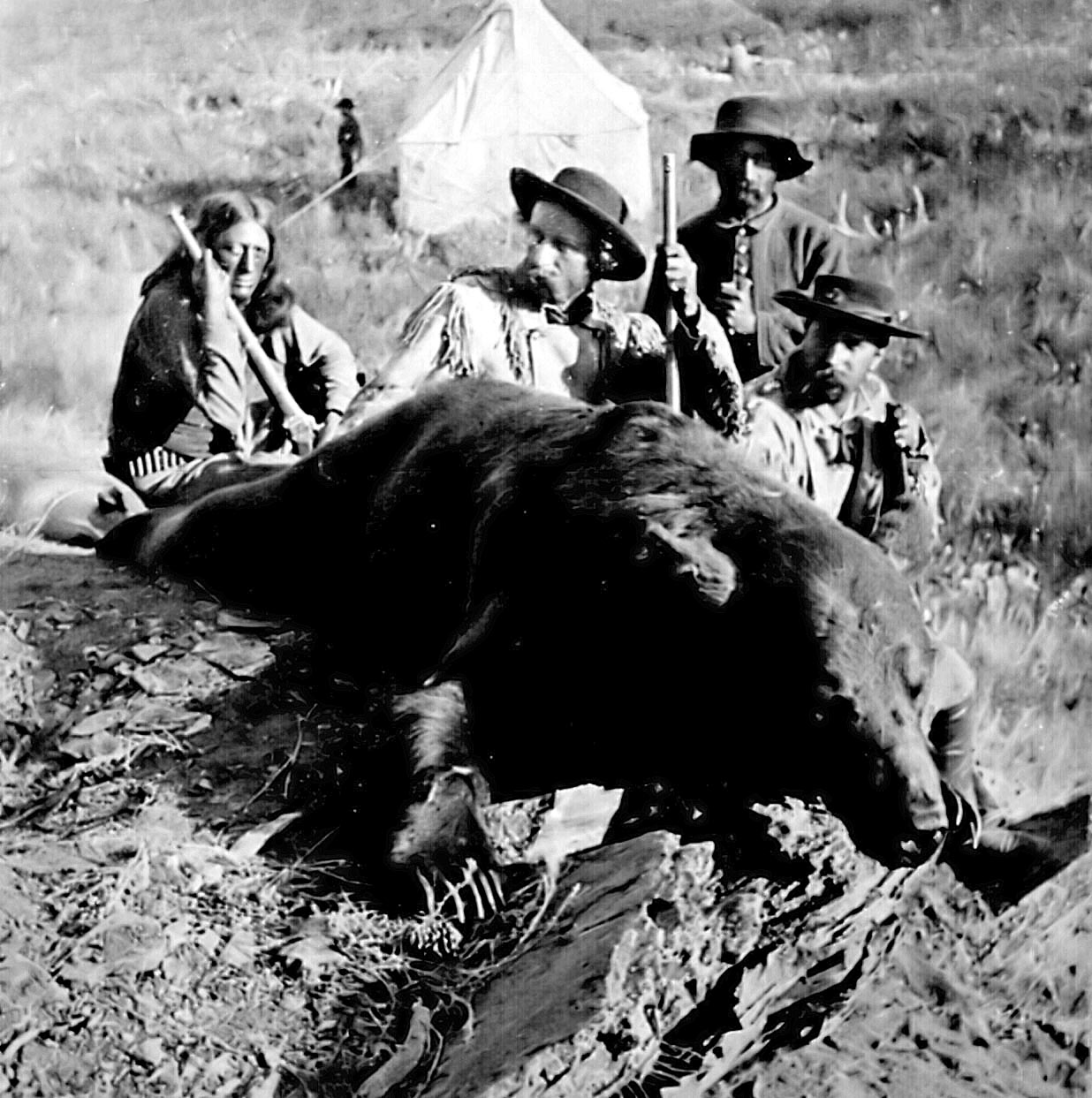
Pictured from left to right are Bloody Knife, George Armstrong Custer, Private John Noonan, and Captain William Ludlow.

In 1874, Bloody Knife took part in the Black Hills Expedition, which included over a thousand men, geologists, infantry, cavalry, two miners, several reporters, and sixty-five Arikara scouts. Shortly before the beginning of the expedition, the Sioux attacked the Arikara village at Fort Berthold, killing five Arikaras and one Mandan. One of Bloody Knife's sons was killed in the attack and another scout, called Bear's Ears or Bear's Eye, lost a brother in the same attack. Bloody Knife blamed the death of his son on Gall. Many of the Arikara on the expedition wanted to avenge the attack and when they found signs of a band of Sioux in the Black Hills, they began to sing war songs and adorned their horses and themselves with war paint. Custer was not interested in solving tribal feuds and ordered the scouts not to attack any Sioux unless fired upon first. Bloody Knife and twenty-five other Arikaras were sent out for more scouting and found a small camp of five lodges. The scouts waited for Custer to arrive with his interpreter, Louis Agard, before taking any action. Although some reports suggested the presence of thousands of warriors in the hills preparing to attack, and most of the expedition thought that a fight would occur soon, Bloody Knife discovered a group of only twenty-seven Oglala Lakota, who had been cutting lodgepoles and hunting in the Black Hills and intended return to the Red Cloud Agency, one hundred miles south of their location. The group had no knowledge of the soldiers in the area and all but one Oglala ran away when Agard and some of the scouts approached them.

On August 7, 1874, Bloody Knife encountered a grizzly bear roughly seventy-five yards from where Custer was searching for a campsite. Custer, having had a lifelong dream of killing a grizzly bear, shot the bear twice with his Remington rifle, hitting it in the thigh, and Bloody Knife and William Ludlow helped with the kill. The bear was an old male with broken teeth, covered in scars, and weighed 800 pounds (360 kg). Though Custer took credit for the kill, some believe that the fatal bullet was fired by Bloody Knife, and 2002 biography The Custer Companion states that the coup de grâce was a cut to the jugular vein by Bloody Knife.

During the Black Hills Expedition, several wagons became stuck at a bank. Custer asked whose fault the delay was and a scout named Charley Reynolds blamed Bloody Knife for the incident. Custer drew his revolver and fired shots in the two scouts' direction. Bloody Knife and Reynolds hid behind some trees. Bloody Knife then told Custer, "It is not a good thing you have done to me; if I had been possessed of madness too, you would not see another day." Custer replied, "My brother, it was the madness of the moment that made me do this, but it is now gone. Let us shake hands and be friends again." Bloody Knife agreed and shook Custer's hand.

While most Indian scouts earned $13 a month, the same amount of pay as the troops received, Custer arranged a job for Bloody Knife with the quartermaster as a guide, where he earned $75 ($2,100 at today's prices) per month. On November 30, 1874, Private Bloody Knife was discharged from service, and for his efforts in the Black Hills Expedition, he received an additional $150 for what was called his "invaluable assistance".

== Death at the Battle of Little Bighorn ==
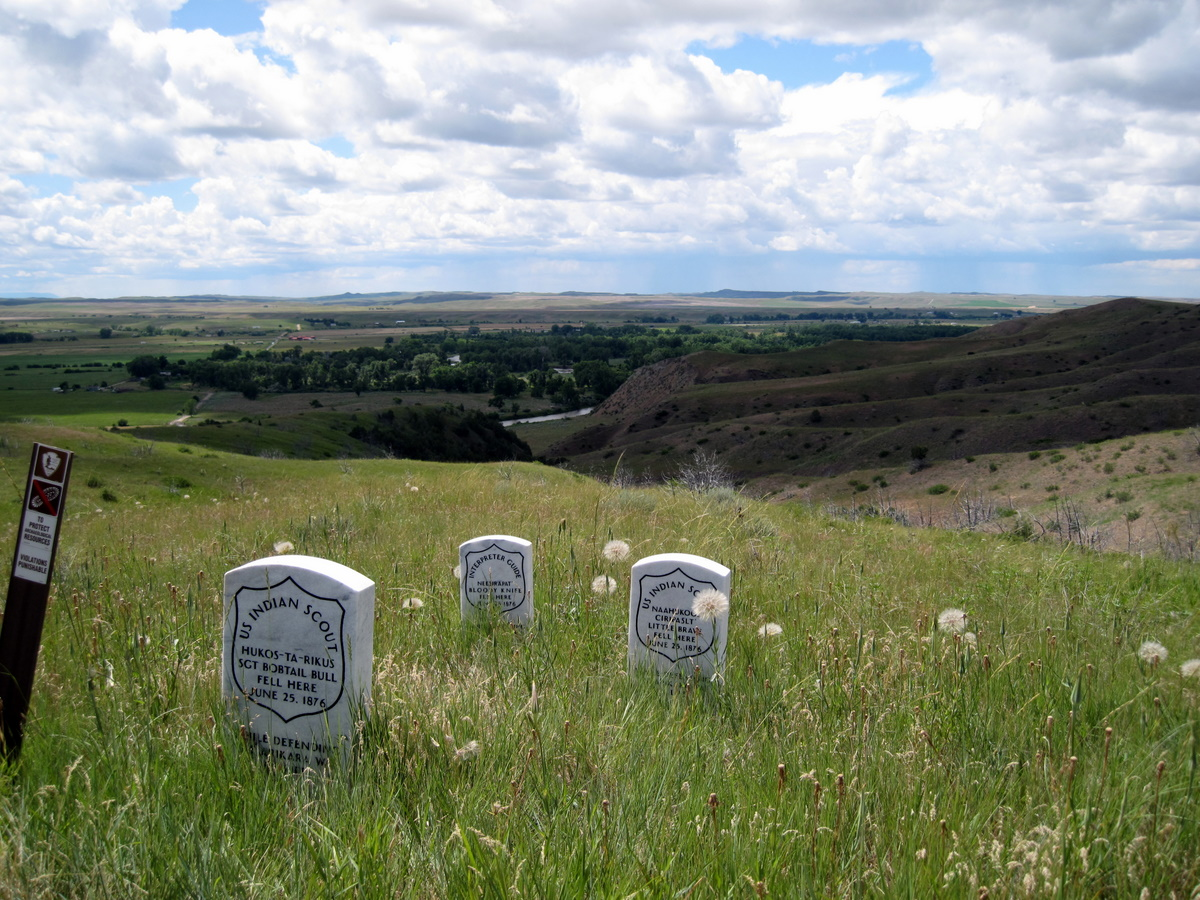
Memorial markers for three Arikara scouts — from left, Sgt. Bobtail Bull, Bloody Knife, and Little Brave — at Custer National Cemetery

In 1876, during the Little Bighorn campaign, Bloody Knife repeatedly tried to warn Custer there were too many Indians to fight. In spite of the overwhelming odds, he refused to stay out of the battle. By some accounts, before the battle began, Bloody Knife signaled to the sun with his hands, "I shall not see you go down behind the hills tonight."

Bloody Knife was assigned to Major Marcus Reno, who had a command of 140 soldiers, at the Battle of the Little Bighorn on June 25, 1876. During the battle, Custer directed Bloody Knife and the other Arikara and Crow scouts to drive off the herds of Indian ponies in the Sioux camp. As Reno's soldiers and scouts approached the camp, the Indians, mostly Lakota and Cheyenne, spotted them and quickly mobilized their warriors to attack Reno. The soldiers quickly dismounted and formed a skirmish line to shoot at the enemy, but they kept coming and Reno's unit, in danger of being flanked, took up a position in timber close to the river. Reportedly, Bloody Knife was standing next to Reno, who had motioned for Bloody Knife to approach him so he could ask Bloody Knife what the Indians would do when his command began to move away from their village. Bloody Knife was shot in the head and killed while mounted on his horse before making a reply. Reno, his face smeared with the gore from Bloody Knife's wound, panicked and ordered a withdrawal. Reno and his men retreated from the woodland across the river with the braves in aggressive pursuit, and his poor response cost many of his troops their lives. Bloody Knife was one of three Arikara scouts assigned to Reno to die during the battle; the others were Little Brave (also known as Bear's Trail or Little Soldier) and Bobtail Bull. The US Army suffered a huge defeat.

Bloody Knife was decapitated by the Sioux. According to Bloody Knife's sister, her daughters had found his body on the battlefield, and unaware that it was the body of their uncle, cut off his head and took it to the Hunkpapa village where it was displayed on a pole. When she saw the head and recognized it as that of her brother, Bloody Knife's sister was horrified. According to David Humphreys Miller, an interviewer who talked with many of the participants and witnesses from the battle, she cried out: "Gall has killed him at last!" However, other accounts do not mention Gall nor the sisters' reactions at their discovery of the head's identity. In the aftermath of the battle, Colonel John Gibbon's troops found and identified by its gray color pattern the scalp of Bloody Knife in an empty Sioux lodge. These remains were buried on the battlefield on June 27, 1876. Later he was buried in the scout cemetery near White Shield, North Dakota.

== Legacy ==
Bloody Knife had wed an Arikara woman named Young Owl Woman, or She Owl, in 1866. He fathered at least three children, a daughter and two sons. The daughter died of an illness on December 28, 1870, and was buried at Fort Buford. One son was killed in a raid by Lakota on the Arikara village before the Black Hills Expedition of 1874. The other lived until 1904, when he was killed supposedly by his own wife. Young Owl Woman served as Bloody Knife's legal heir. On April 14, 1879, she appeared at Fort Berthold to claim outstanding pay for his services to the army. In 1881, she received his final $91.66 in wages from the US Government.

Bloody Knife's deeds were remembered in song composed by the Arikara scouts after his death at the Battle of Little Big Horn. His story spread wide, and he became one of the more famous scouts associated with the army. In the 1991 television mini-series Son of the Morning Star, Bloody Knife was portrayed by Sheldon Peters Wolfchild.
