= George H. Roach =

19th c. U.S. Army officer

George Henderson Roach
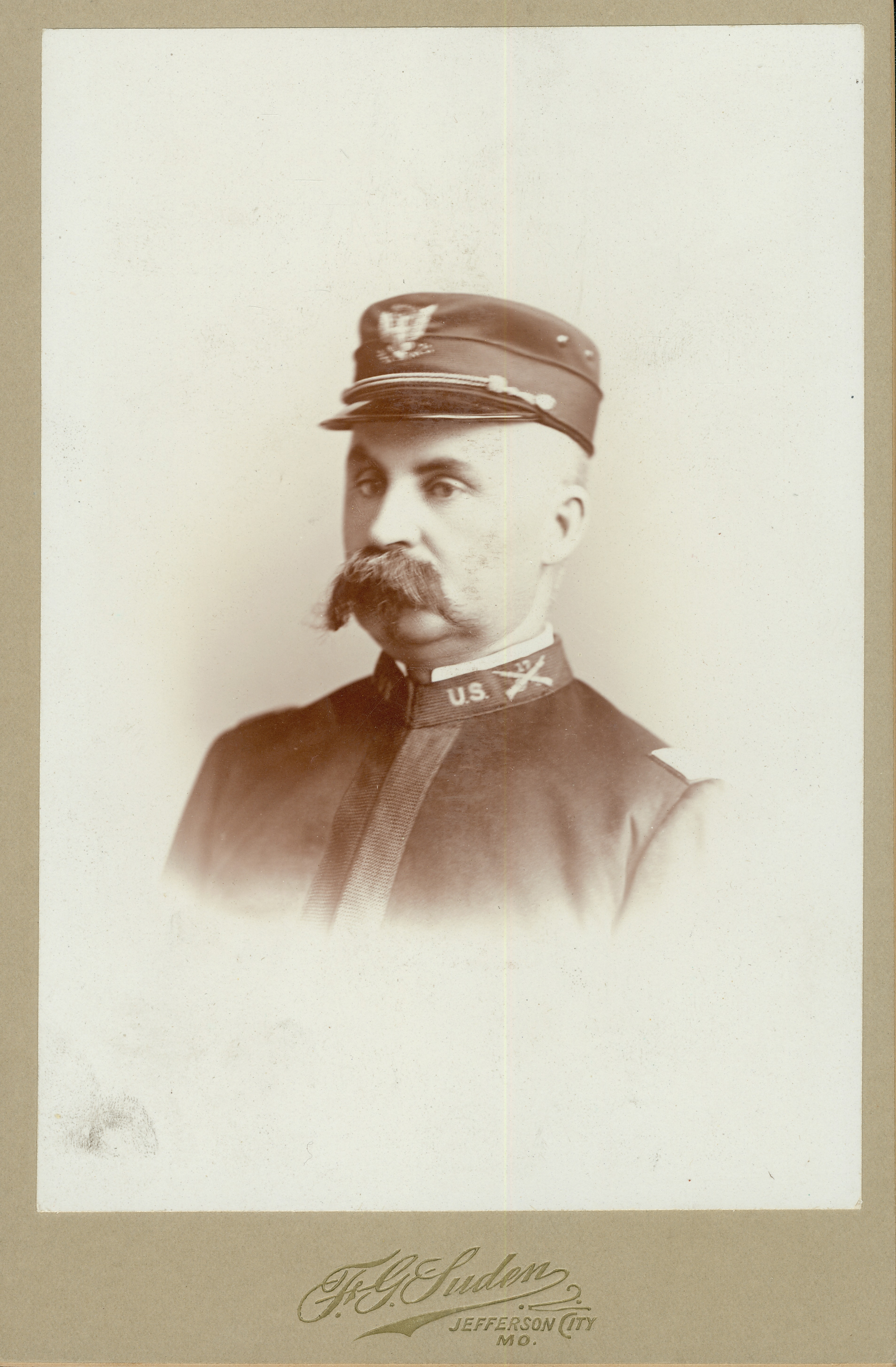
- Born: June 19, 1847; Schoharie, New York, U.S.
- Died: November 29, 1909 (aged 62); Washington, D.C., U.S.
- Burial place: Arlington National Cemetery
- Military career
- Allegiance: United States; Union
- Branch: United States Army; Union Army
- Service years: 1864–1865, 1873–1906
- Rank: Colonel
- Units: 26th Illinois Infantry; 17th U.S. Infantry; 20th U.S. Infantry
- Commands: Company G, 17th U.S. Infantry; Indian Scouts, Department of Dakota
- Conflicts: American Civil War; Atlanta campaign; Battle of Resaca; Battle of Dallas; Battle of New Hope Church; Battle of Kennesaw Mountain; Battle of Atlanta; Battle of Ezra Church; Battle of Jonesboro; Savannah Campaign; Battle of Griswoldville; Second Battle of Fort McAllister; Carolinas campaign; Battle of Bentonville; American Indian Wars; Black Hills Expedition; Great Sioux War of 1876; Ghost Dance War; Leech Lake Uprising; Spanish–American War; Battle of El Caney; Battle of San Juan Hill; Philippine–American War

George Henderson Roach (June 19, 1847 – November 29, 1909) was a United States Army officer who saw extensive service during the American Civil War, American Indian Wars, Spanish–American War, and Philippine–American War.

== Biography ==
George Henderson Roach was born in Schoharie, New York to Thomas and Nancy Roach on June 19, 1847. He later settled in Illinois.

== Civil War Service ==
During the American Civil War, Roach enlisted and was mustered in as a private in Company F, 26th Illinois Infantry Regiment on February 27, 1864, when he was sixteen years old. He participated in the Atlanta campaign, fighting at the battles of Resaca, Dallas, New Hope Church, Kennesaw Mountain, Atlanta, Ezra Church, Jonesboro, the Savannah Campaign, fighting at Griswoldville, and Fort McAllister, and the Carolinas campaign, fighting at the Bentonville. Roach then marched with his regiment to Washington, D.C. and participated in the Grand Review of the Armies, before he was honorably mustered out of the volunteer service on July 29, 1865.

== Service in the West ==
Roach was recommended by the colonel of the 26th Illinois for a regular commission in the U.S. Army, and on the recommendation of Attorney General George Henry Williams, he was commissioned as a second lieutenant in the 17th U.S. Infantry, on October 1, 1873, and was stationed at Fort Abraham Lincoln on the western frontier. He would serve in Dakota Territory for the next thirteen years. He participated in the Black Hills Expedition of 1874 led by Lieutenant Colonel George Armstrong Custer that set off the Black Hills gold rush and sparked the Great Sioux War of 1876. By October 1875, Roach was stationed at Standing Rock Agency. From April 20-November 22, 1876, he was assigned as commanding officer of a detachment of Indian scouts. In 1886, Roach transferred to Fort D. A. Russell in Wyoming Territory and later served on the Pine Ridge Indian Reservation during the Ghost Dance War. He was promoted to major of the 17th U.S. Infantry.

In the aftermath of the Battle of the Little Bighorn, his wife Flora Elsie Roach came into possession of a 7th U.S. Cavalry guidon captured by Lakota people at the battle. According to Roach's son Leon, either an Indian woman or a young Indian boy encamped at Standing Rock Agency in Dakota Territory gave her the guidon. Most Indians associated with the Standing Rock Agency were Hunkpapa Lakota who had received the brunt of Major Marcus Reno's attack on the village. This rare artifact is currently in possession of the South Dakota State Historical Society.

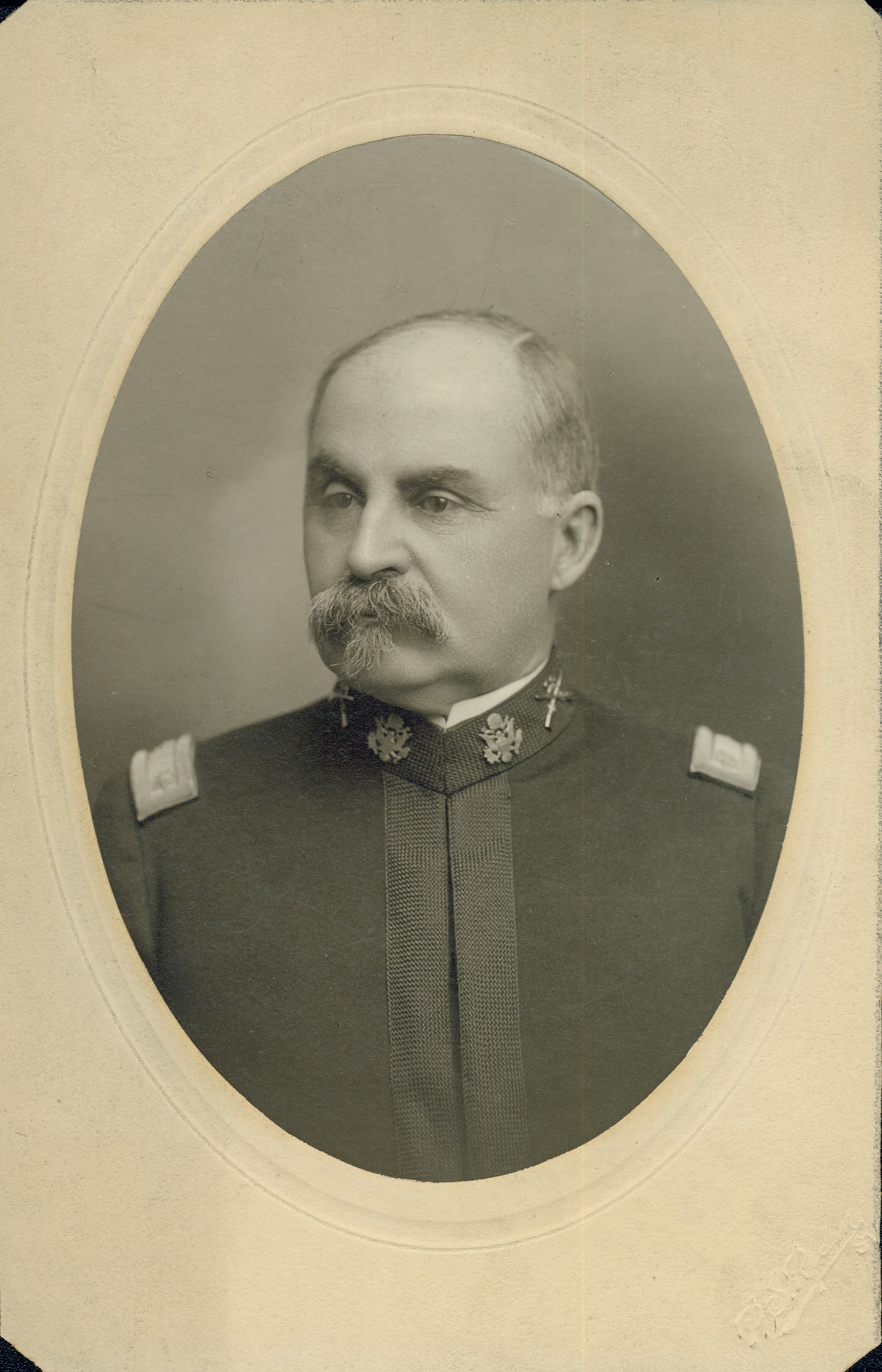
Roach near the end of his career

== Spanish–American War Service ==
At the outbreak of the Spanish–American War in 1898, Roach's regiment deployed to Cuba and participated in the battles of El Caney and San Juan Hill. Roach returned to the United States and was immediately ordered to Minnesota to help quell the Leech Lake Uprising. Roach returned to his regiment, and on January 9, 1899, they sailed from New York for the Philippines. He then participated in the Philippine–American War, rising to the rank of lieutenant colonel of the 20th U.S. Infantry in March 1904. He was retired on account of disability in February 1906, in the advanced grade of colonel because of his service in the Union Army during the Civil War.

== Personal life ==
In 1868, Roach married Flora Elsie Emmons. George and Flora raised two sons, Leon and Edmund. Leon Roach had a lifelong distinguished career in the U.S. Army and retired as a colonel.

== Death ==
George H. Roach died on November 29, 1909, in Washington, D.C., and was buried with full military honors in Arlington National Cemetery.
