= Black Hills Expedition =

1874 U.S. army expedition

Black Hills Expedition (1874)
- Part of the Sioux Wars
Date	July 2, 1874 – August 30, 1874
Location	Dakota Territory and Montana Territory

Belligerents
- United States

Commanders and leaders
- (United States) George A. Custer (United States) Frederick D. Grant

Units involved
- 7th United States Cavalry Regiment

Strength
- ~1,200 Soldiers and Civilians

Casualties and losses
- 1 killed

The Black Hills Expedition was a United States Army expedition in 1874 led by Lieutenant Colonel George Armstrong Custer that set out on July 2, 1874, from Fort Abraham Lincoln, Dakota Territory, which is south of modern day Mandan, North Dakota, with orders to travel to the previously uncharted Black Hills of South Dakota. Its mission was to look for suitable locations for a fort, find a route to the southwest, and to investigate the possibility of gold mining. Custer and his unit, the 7th Cavalry, arrived in the Black Hills on July 22, 1874, with orders to return by August 30. The expedition set up a camp at the site of the future town of Custer; while Custer and the military units searched for a suitable location for a fort, civilians searched for gold, and it is disputed whether or not any substantial amount was found. Nonetheless, this prompted a mass gold rush which in turn antagonised the Sioux Indians who had been promised protection of their sacred land through Treaties made by the US government, and who were later to kill Custer at the Battle of the Little Big Horn in the Great Sioux War of 1876–1877 between themselves and the United States.

The entire expedition was photographed by William H. Illingworth, an English photographer who accompanied Custer after selection by the then-Captain William Ludlow. Ludlow, the engineer for the expedition, financed Illingworth's photography and paid him $30 per month to provide photographic plates for the US Army, of which he made 70 in all.

== Expedition ==
=== Embarking for the Black Hills ===
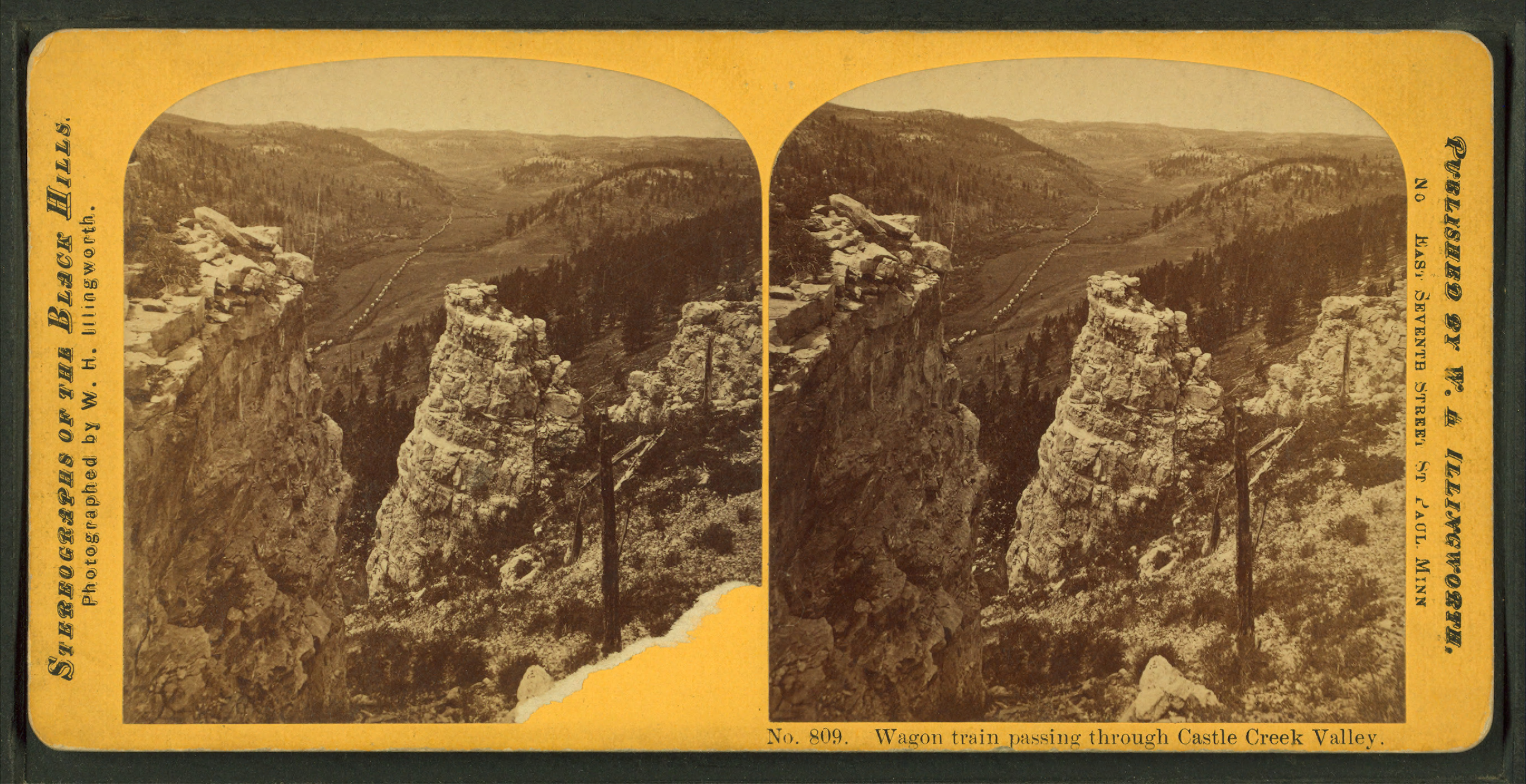
Custer's wagon train passing through Castle Creek valley, by William H. Illingworth

Custer embarked on his expedition with 1000-1200 men, in 110 wagons with numerous horses and cattle of the 7th Cavalry, along with artillery and two months food supply. The expedition also took a number of Native American scouts led by Bloody Knife and Lean Bear. At the time, the Black Hills were relatively unknown, with few white expeditions ever returning from them The commander of Custer's engineering corps, Captain Hardy, assured him that he had heard of them and had them marked on his maps, but had never entered them during his earlier expeditions. En route to the Black Hills, Custer's party managed to locate the track of Hardy's group when they spotted two lines of sunflowers that had grown along the ruts of his passing wagons.

Custer and his force entered the Black Hills from the north, travelling south at a slow pace of no more than four or five miles a day on some occasions. On July 31, 1874, the wagon train reached Harney Peak (now Black Elk Peak), and Custer together with Ludlow took three or four men to climb it. In the meantime, the rest of the expedition made camp at the mountain's base at the newly named Custer Park. While the majority of the force remained there, Custer took a small unit with him to locate a suitable site for a new fort. By August 2, 1874, this force had reached a point eight and a half miles south-east of the mountain, to a location they named Agnes Park, having had a number of peaceful encounters with Native American settlements. On August 7 Custer shot and killed a grizzly bear, forever claiming this to be his greatest achievement as a hunter.

=== Discovery of gold ===
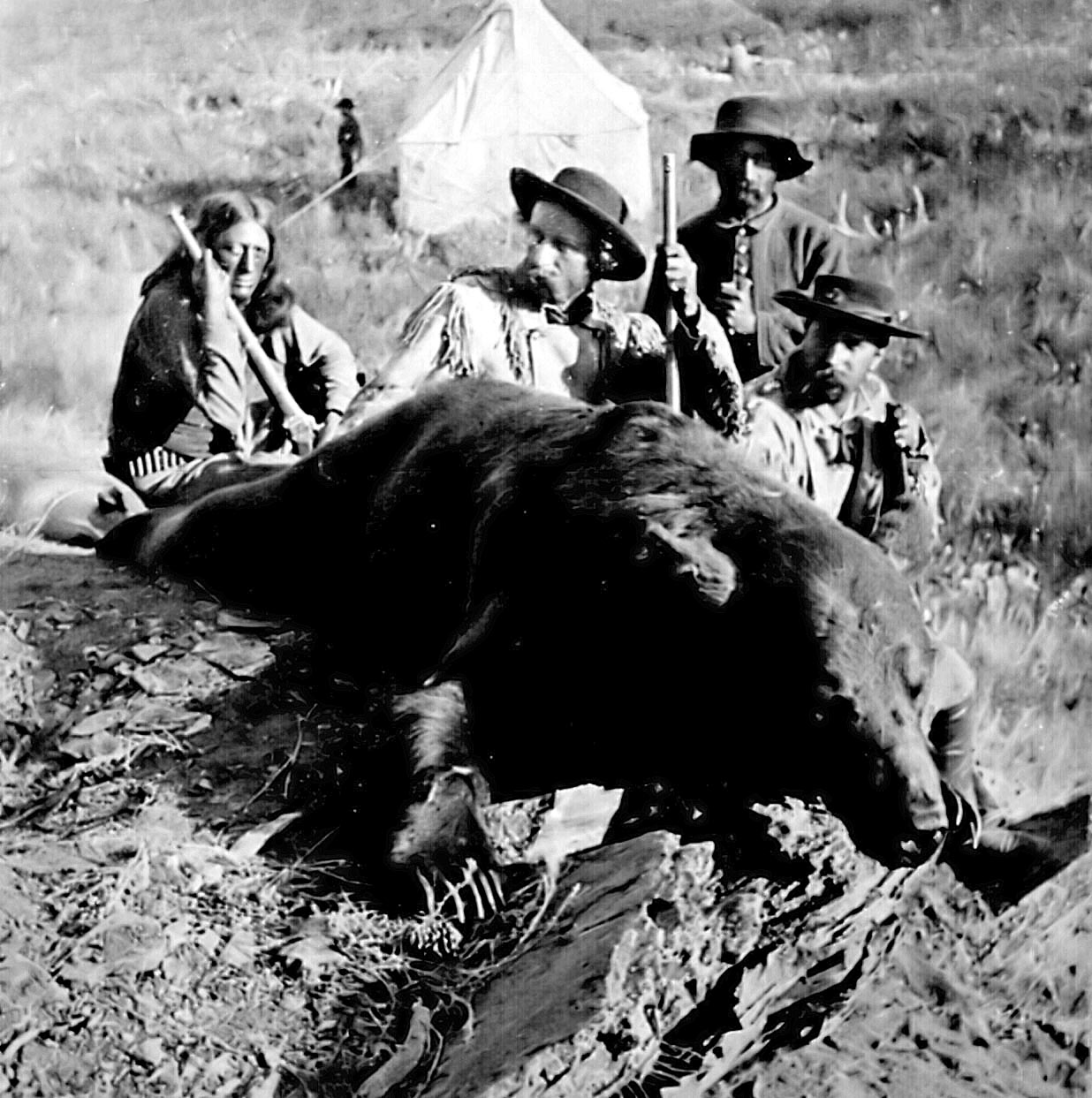
The bear Custer shot and later said was his greatest hunting achievement

Throughout the expedition, civilian experts who accompanied the expedition located traces of gold in the rivers. The first discovery goes uncredited, however an undated diary entry by William McKay, a miner accompanying the expedition, notes that while he was camping at the newly named Custer Park, "In the evening I took a pan, pick and shovel, and went out prospecting. The first panful was taken from the gravel and sand obtained in the bed of the creek; and on washing was found to contain from one and a half to two cents, which was the first gold found in the Black Hills." A significant discovery was made on August 1 when tests of the soil by the French Creek determined that a miner could earn as much as $150 per day mining in the Black Hills. Custer wrote in a letter of August 15, 1874 to the Assistant Adjutant General of the Department of Dakota that "there is no doubt as to the existence of various metals throughout the hills. ... [And] examinations at numerous points confirm and strengthen the fact of the existence of gold in the Black Hills." His messages were carried by scout Charley Reynolds to Fort Laramie, and from there it was telegraphed to the press eastwards.

"There is no doubt as to the existence of various metals throughout the hills. As this subject has received the special attention of experts who accompanied the expedition, and will be reported upon in detail, I will only mention the fact that iron and plumbago have been found and beds of gypsum of apparently inexhaustible extent. I referred in a former dispatch to the discovery of gold. Subsequent examinations at numerous points confirm and strengthen the fact of the existence of gold in the Black Hills."

— Custer, a letter to the Assistant Adjutant General of Dakota, August 15, 1874, Eyewitnesses to the Indian Wars, 1865-1890, Peter Cozzens, page 166.

The force remained there at Agnes Park until August 15 whereupon it turned around to return to Fort Lincoln. The expedition returned on August 30, with the scouts returned to their reservations on September 10. In total, Custer and his forces had traveled for 60 days over 883 miles.

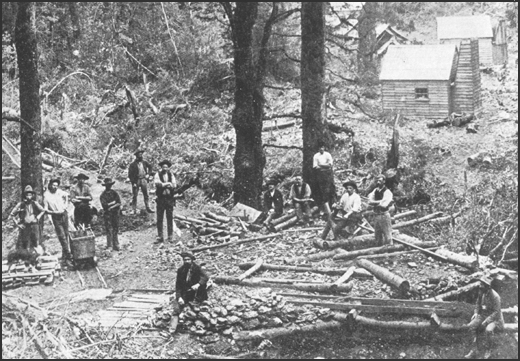
Gold miners in the Black Hills. The gold rushes that resulted from Custer's discoveries antagonised the Sioux Indians and provoked the war in which Custer was to lose his life.

== Organization of the Expedition ==
The table of organisation for the 7th Cavalry for the Black Hills Expedition of 1874 was as follows.

7th U.S. Cavalry

- Field and staff
  - Lt. Colonel George Armstrong Custer
  - Lt. Colonel Frederick D. Grant, 4th cavalry and acting aide
  - Major George A. Forsyth, 9th cavalry commander
  - First Lieutenant James Calhoun, adjutant
  - First Lieutenant Algernon E. Smith, quartermaster
  - Second Lieutenant George D. Wallace, commander of the Indian scouts

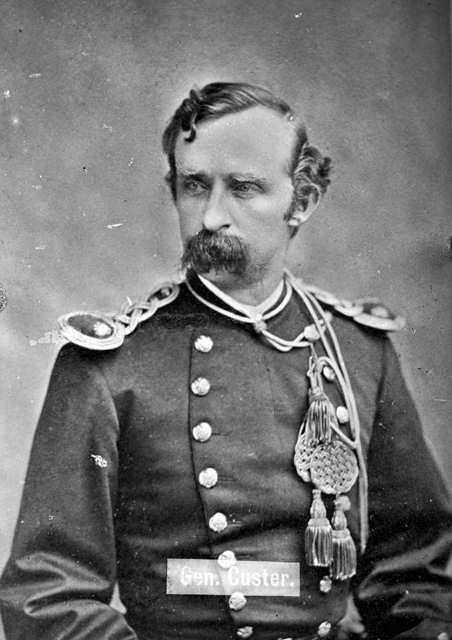
Lieutenant Colonel George A. Custer, 7th U.S. Cavalry, March 1876 by Jose Mora

- Cavalry companies
  - Company A - Captain Myles Moylan and Second Lieutenant Charles Varnum
  - Company B - First Lieutenant Benjamin H. Hodgson
  - Company C - Captain Verling Hart and Second Lieutenant Henry M. Harrington
  - Company E - First Lieutenant Thomas M. McDougall
  - Company F - Captain George W. Yates
  - Company G - First Lieutenant Donald McIntosh
  - Company H - Captain Frederick W. Benteen and First Lieutenant Francis M. Gibson
  - Company K - Captain Owen Hale and First Lieutenant Edward S. Godfrey
  - Company L - First Lieutenant Thomas W. Custer
  - Company M - Captain Thomas French and First Lieutenant Edward Gustave Mathey

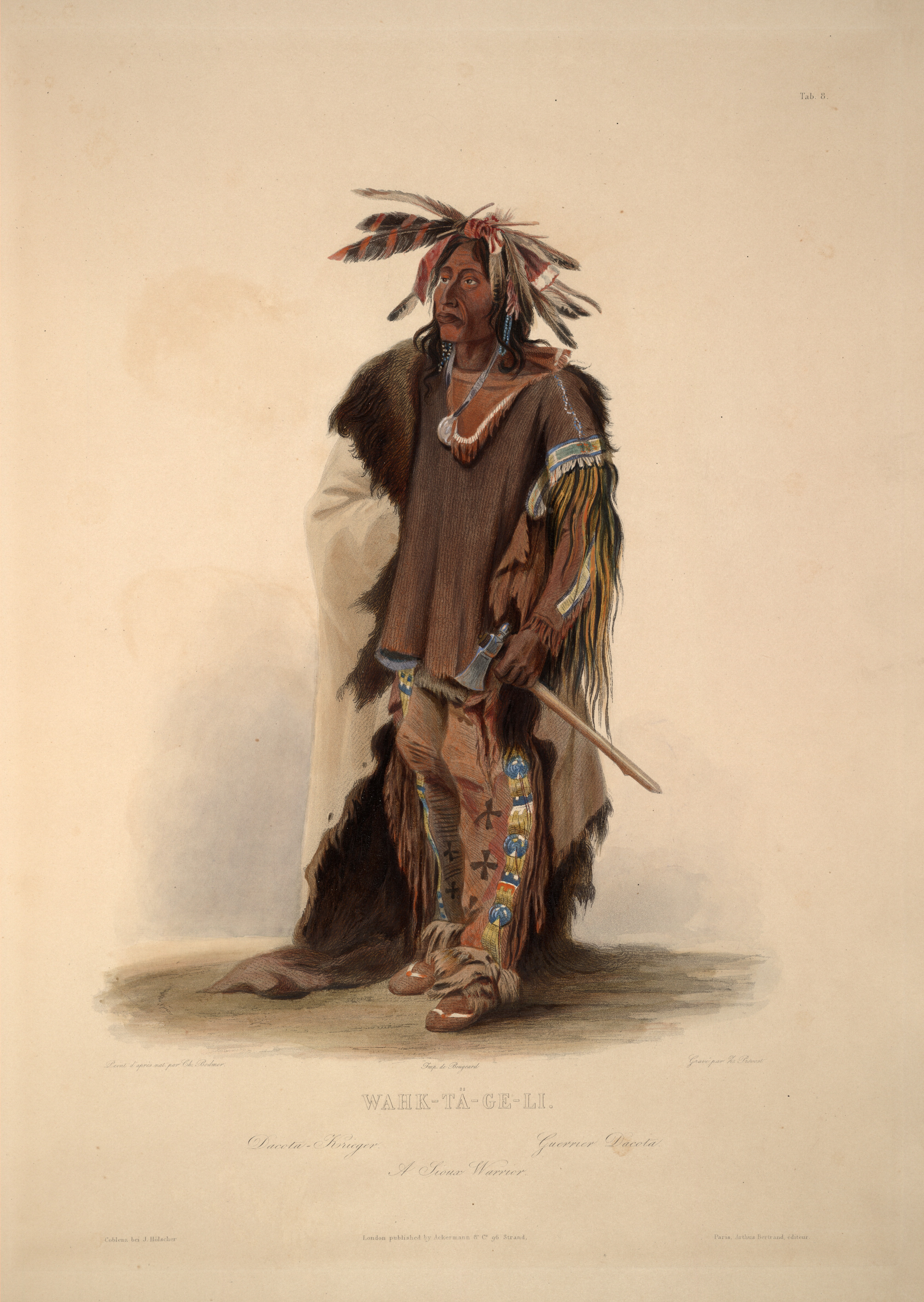
Wahktageli ("Galant Warrior"), a Yankton Sioux chief (by Karl Bodmer)

- Medical staff
  - Dr. John W. Williams, chief medical officer
  - Dr. S. J. Allen, Jr. assistant surgeon
  - Dr. A. C. Bergen, assistant surgeon
- Engineering
  - Captain William Ludlow, chief engineer
  - W. H. Wood, civilian assistant
- Mining detachment
  - Horatio Nelson Ross
  - William McKay
- Scientist
  - George Bird Grinnell
  - Newton Horace Winchell
  - A. B. Donaldson
  - Luther North
- Photographer
  - William H. Illingworth
- Correspondents
  - William E. Curtis, Chicago Inter-Ocean
  - Samuel J. Barrows, New York Tribune
  - Sygurd Wiśniowski, New Ulm Herald
  - Nathan H. Knappen, Bismarck Tribune

Additionally, two companies of U.S. Infantry accompanied the Black Hills Expedition:

- Infantry companies
  - Company G, 17th U.S. Infantry - Brevet Major Louis Sanger and Second Lieutenant George H. Roach
  - Company I, 20th U.S. Infantry - Captain Loyd Wheaton, Second Lieutenant J. Granville Gates
