= William H. Illingworth =

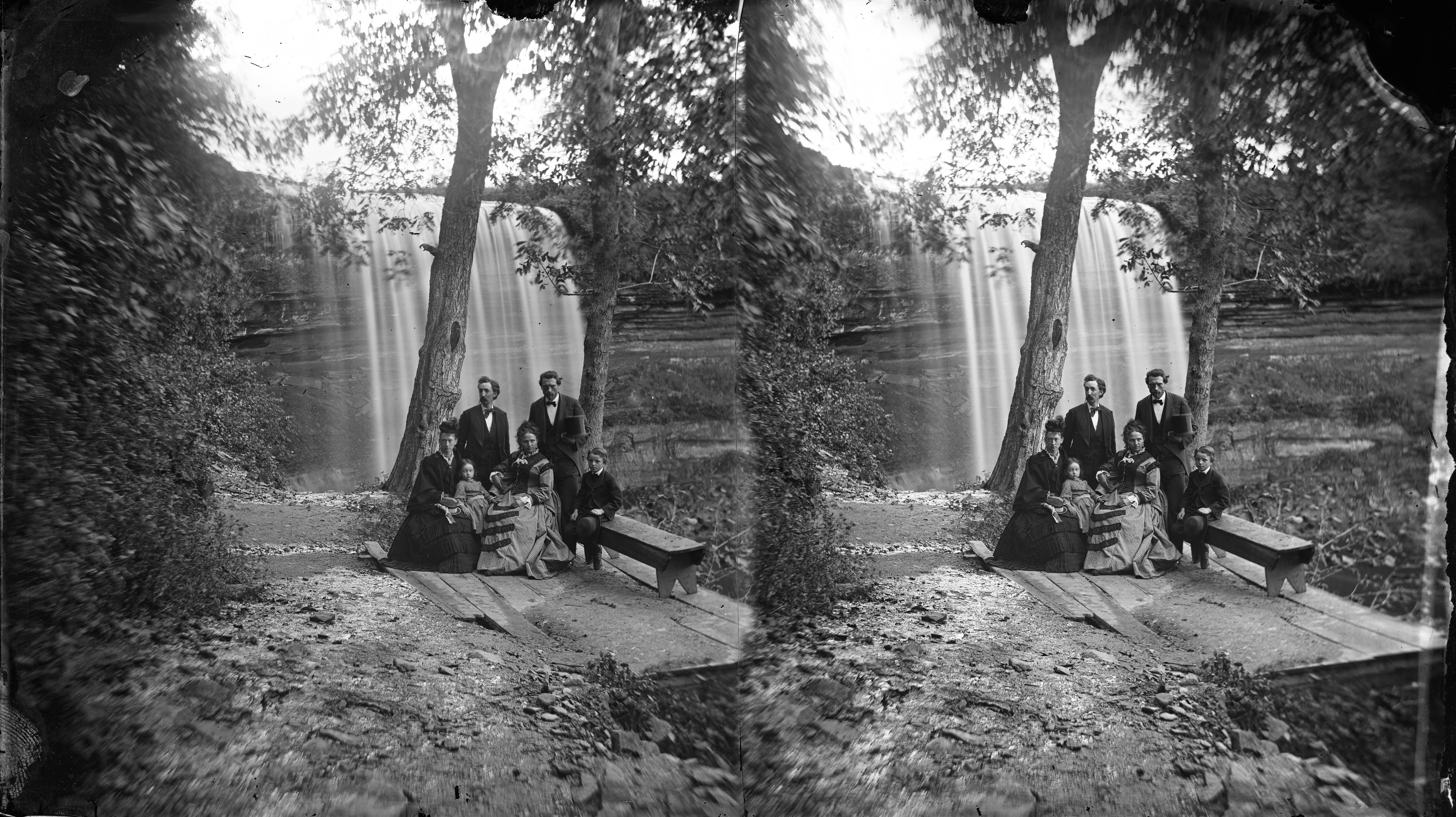
William Illingworth and his family at Minnehaha Falls (1870)

William H. Illingworth (20 September 1844 – 16 March 1893) was an English born photographer from St. Paul, Minnesota who accompanied both Captain James L. Fisk's 1866 expedition to the Montana Territory and Lt. Colonel George Custer's 1874 U.S. military expedition into the Black Hills of the Dakota Territory (now western South Dakota).

== Early life ==
William Henry Illingworth was born in Leeds, England, on 20 September 1844. He immigrated with his parents to Philadelphia, Pennsylvania while still a young child. In 1850, his family relocated to St. Paul, Minnesota, where his father operated a jewelry business. Illingworth helped in the business until he was about 20 years old, when he moved to Chicago to study wet plate photography.

Shortly after Illingworth's return to St. Paul in 1866, he joined Captain James L. Fisk's fourth expedition to the Montana Territory. Working with photographer, business partner and expedition member George Bill, Illingworth produced 30 stereographs from this expedition that likely became the basis of a gallery and studio that he and Bill opened the following year in St. Paul. From 1870 to 1873, Illingworth worked as a photographer for railroad construction crews. Sometime in the 1870s, Illingworth and William McLeish formed a partnership called Illingworth & McLeish, that produced stereographs.

== Custer's 1874 expedition to the Black Hills ==
Probably due to his experience on the fourth Fisk expedition, Illingworth was selected as photographer to Custer's 1874 military expedition by then-Captain William Ludlow (referred to as "Col. Ludlow" by journalists covering the expedition, perhaps because he received a brevet during the Civil War). Ludlow was the Chief Engineer of the Department of Dakota, and was in charge of mapping and scientific data collection for the expedition. He provided Illingworth necessary equipment, rations and supplies, and added Illingworth to the civilian payroll as a "teamster", with a salary of $30 per month. In return, Illingworth was expected to provide six sets of his exposed plates to the US Army. The wagon carrying Illingworth's equipment is estimated to have weighed nearly 400 lbs (c. 182 kg). Illingworth and the U.S. 7th Cavalry Regiment departed for the Black Hills on 2 July 1874 from Fort Abraham Lincoln on the west bank of the Missouri River, seven miles south of what is now Mandan, North Dakota, and returned 30 August 1874.

While on the expedition, Illingworth produced about 70 glass plates – 60 of them were landscapes of the Black Hills and portraits of members of the 7th Cavalry. Most of his images are considered to be very well composed from both a technical and artistic perspective.

Captain Ludlow was pleased by Illingworth's work, but after the conclusion of the expedition Illingworth did not provide Ludlow with six sets of plates as promised, instead providing one partial set. In his preliminary report on the expedition published in the 14 September 1874 issue of the New York Tribune, Ludlow wrote, "the photographer secured negatives for about sixty views, a set of which will accompany the report." Illingworth said that he did not have the time or money to produce the remaining sets of plates, but Ludlow soon discovered that the St. Paul photographic firm Huffington and Winne was offering complete sets of Illingworth's images of the expedition for sale. Ludlow sued Illingworth for embezzlement. When Illingworth escaped conviction on a legal technicality, Ludlow requested that the War Department press charges. The matter was eventually dropped, and the negatives remained in Illingworth's possession until his death.

== Personal life and later years ==
Illingworth was widowed twice and his third wife divorced him in 1888. Alone, an alcoholic and in poor health, Illingworth committed suicide with his hunting rifle on 16 March 1893.

== Illingworth's legacy ==
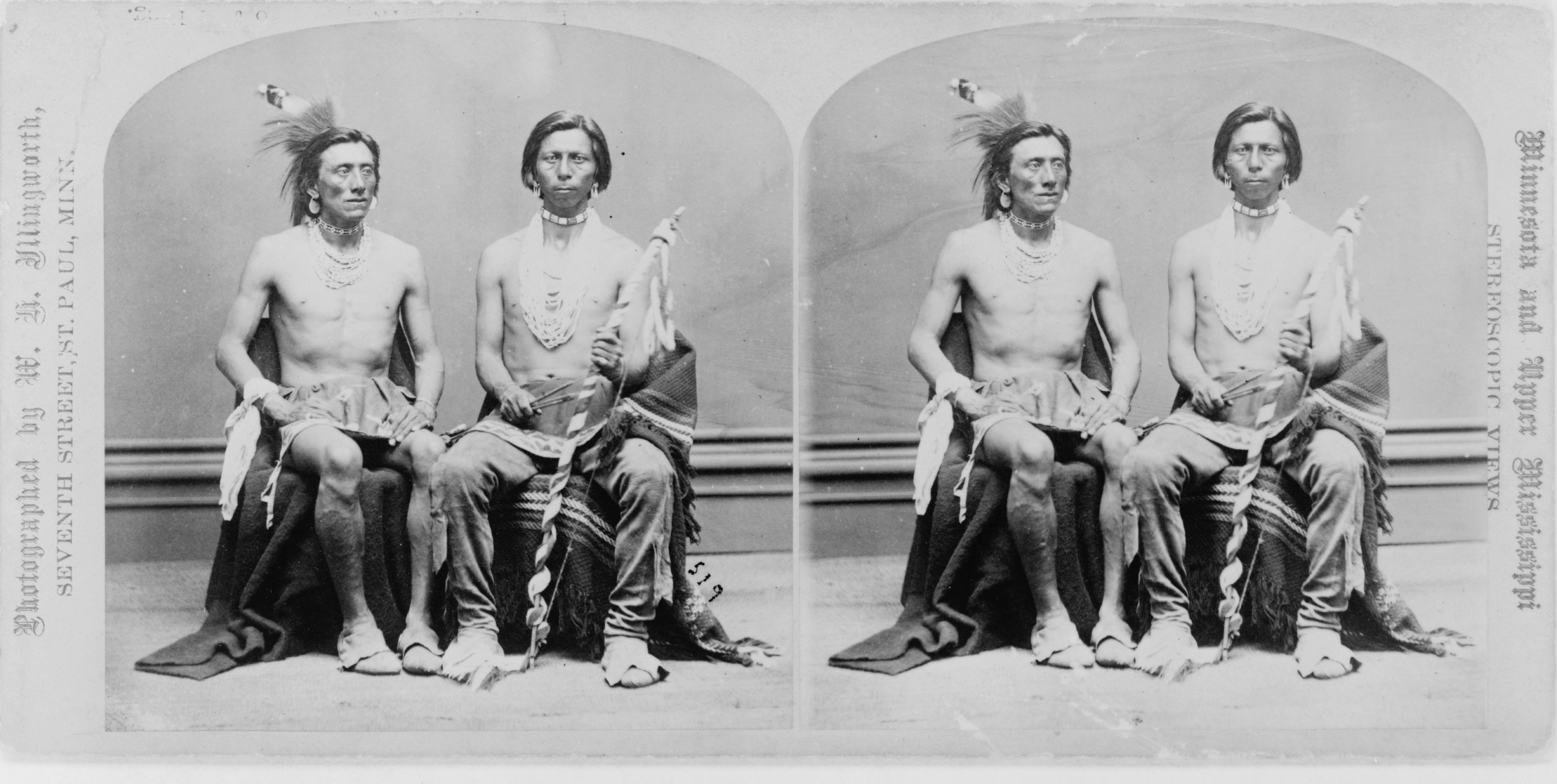
A stereocard of two Winnebago men photographed by William H. Illingworth.

Illingworth produced some 1,600 negatives of the West and Midwest during his career. Many of these photos still exist in collections due to Illingworth's son who found the negatives in a St. Paul attic, and later sold his father's collection to a man named Bromley. Bromley, in turn, sold the Black Hills images for $60 to the South Dakota State Historical Society in 1919.

Because of Illingworth's images, historians have been able to determine the exact boundaries and layouts of several of the 7th Cavalry's 1874 camps, the condition of the Black Hills forests along the expedition's route, and the appearance of many of the soldiers and civilians who accompanied the expedition. In this way, Illingworth's work provided later generations insight into key events of his time.
