= Donald McIntosh =

American military officer (1838–1876)

- Born: September 4, 1838; Montreal, Lower Canada
- Died: June 25, 1876 (aged 37); Montana
- Burial place: Arlington National Cemetery
- Military career
- Allegiance: United States of America; Union
- Branch: United States Army; Union Army
- Service years: 1867–1876
- Rank: First Lieutenant
- Unit: 7th U.S. Cavalry
- Conflicts: American Indian Wars: Battle of the Little Big Horn †

Donald McIntosh (September 4, 1838 – June 25, 1876) was an officer in the U.S. 7th Cavalry Regiment who was killed at the Battle of Little Big Horn in the Montana Territory.

== Biography ==
McIntosh was born in Montreal, Lower Canada, the son of James (John) and Charlotte Robinson McIntosh (she was a direct descendant of Red Jacket, a chief of the Six Nations). His father, part of the Hudson's Bay Company, was killed by First Nations people when Donald was 14. Young McIntosh lived in various posts of the Hudson's Bay Company and later in Fort Vancouver, Washington, before moving to Oregon City in 1851 and Portland, Oregon, in 1854.

During the American Civil War, he was chief clerk for Brig. Gen. Daniel H. Rucker in the Quartermaster Department. McIntosh married Mary (Molly) Garrett on October 30, 1866, in Baltimore, Maryland. He was appointed as Second Lieutenant, 7th U. S. Cavalry, on August 17, 1867, and was promoted to First Lieutenant on March 22, 1870. In the absence of the company commander, Custer assigned McIntosh to command Company G for the 1876 summer expedition from Fort Abraham Lincoln.

During the early stages of the fight along the Little Big Horn River, Major Marcus Reno took three companies of cavalry and swung through the river valley in an effort to attack the Indian village, while Custer headed off to attack the sprawling camp from the rear. Reno's attack met with initial resistance, and he ordered his troops to dismount and form a skirmish line across the valley flats for about 15 minutes. Not making any headway, he retreated with his men into a stand of timber along the river, where they formed a defensive perimeter. Shortly after the sudden death of his scout Bloody Knife, Reno lost control of the tactical situation. He ordered a desperate withdrawal back across the river onto the bluffs. G Company was among the last to leave the timber. Indians knocked McIntosh from his horse and quickly killed him. His badly mutilated body was recovered two days later when a relief column arrived.

His body was originally buried where he fell. His remains were exhumed in July 1877 and re-interred the following month in Fort Leavenworth National Cemetery. In 1909, the remains were disinterred and shipped to Arlington National Cemetery for permanent burial in Section 1. His widow received a pension of $30 per month until her death on May 12, 1910, when she was buried with him. McIntosh's brother-in-law, Francis M. Gibson (who survived the Little Big Horn fight) is buried nearby.

In the summer of 1995, a finger bone with a ring was dug up on the site of Reno's battle near McIntosh's memorial marker. The ring was identified as McIntosh's wedding band by the inscribed initials of the slain officer and his wife, and the date of their wedding. It now is in a private museum in Garryowen, Montana.
