= Mrs. Bridge =

1959 novel by Evan S. Connell

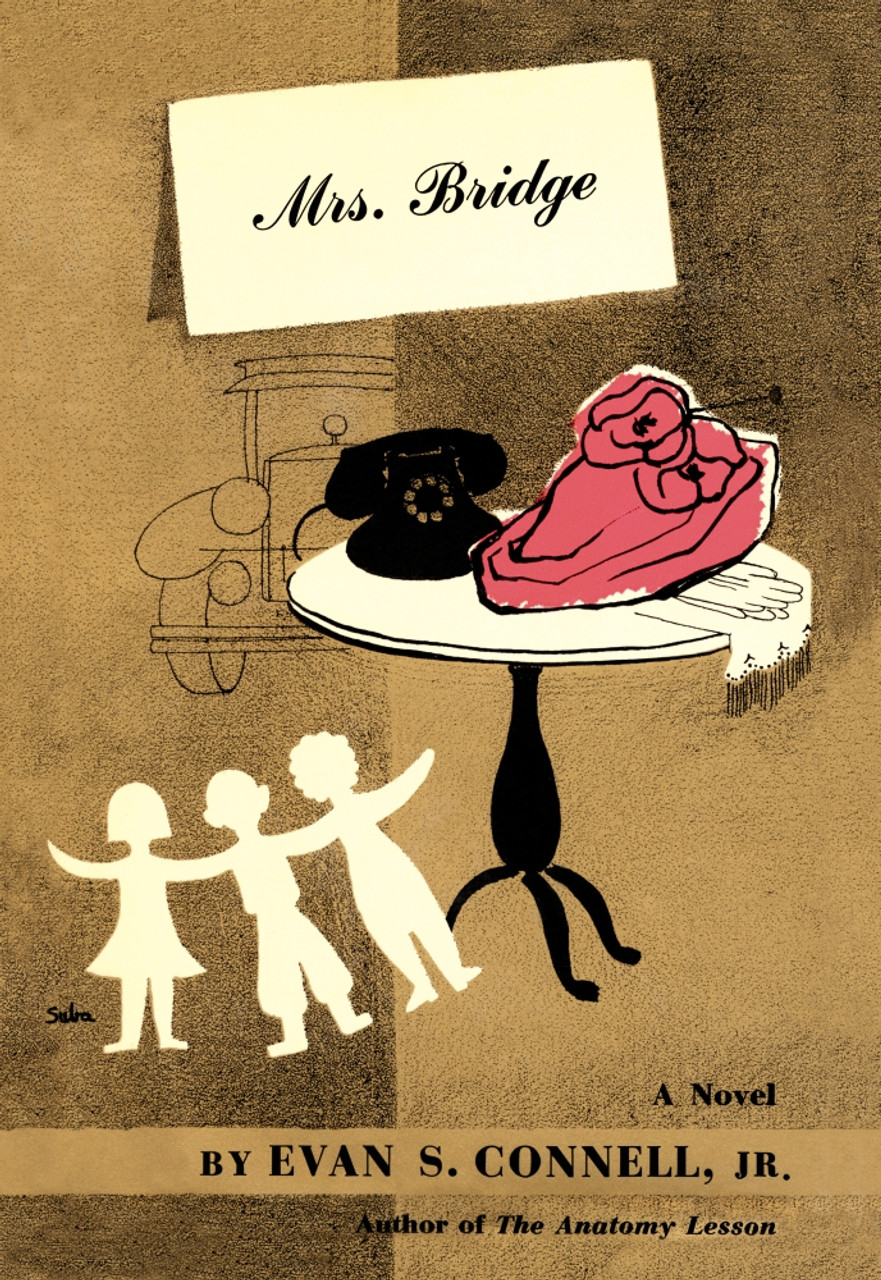
First edition Cover art by Susanne Suba

Mrs. Bridge is the debut novel by American author Evan S. Connell, published in 1959. Comprising 117 brief episodes, it tells the story of an upper-middle-class family in Kansas City during the period between the First and Second World Wars, primarily from the perspective of the mother, Mrs. Bridge. The novel explores how Mrs. Bridge and her family navigate the changing social norms and moral values of the time, particularly regarding civil rights and gender roles.

The book was followed by a companion novel, Mr. Bridge, published in 1969. Both novels were adapted into the film Mr. and Mrs. Bridge (1990).

== Synopsis ==
The eponymous character, India Bridge, is a wife and mother of three in an affluent family in Kansas City. Her husband, Walter, is a lawyer who spends most of his time at the office. Mrs. Bridge's life centers around her children and takes place largely within the home and the country club, within a social environment defined by values such as "unity, sameness, consensus, [and] centeredness."

Her fears and anxieties are expressed through her actions rather than explicitly stated. One example, described by a reviewer as a moment of "inarticulate rage," occurs when her son uses one of the guest towels: "'These towels are for guests,' said Mrs. Bridge, and felt herself unaccountably on the verge of tears." She is also vaguely disturbed by her son's tendency to enter the house through the servants' entrance rather than the front door, which prompts her to reflect on issues of class.

The novel is structured as 117 vignettes organized chronologically from the 1920s to the early 1940s. There is little in the way of conventional plot, reflecting Mrs. Bridge's life, in which nothing overtly dramatic seems to occur. Her first name, "India," symbolizes the elusive excitement and meaning she feels is missing from her life: "It seemed to her that her parents must have been thinking of someone else when they named her."

As the narrative progresses, Mrs. Bridge experiences a series of near-realizations about her own life. One such moment occurs when she encounters a copy of Theory of the Leisure Class, a social critique of conspicuous consumption, in a bookshop. Though she only skims it, the book leaves her feeling unsettled. Another friend, Grace, once asks her if she ever feels "all hollowed out in the back," a question Mrs. Bridge recalls only after learning of Grace’s suicide.

The companion novel, Mr. Bridge, is longer and, according to one critic, explores a more complex life. It depicts many of the same "key moments" from Walter Bridge's perspective. Scholar Gerald Shapiro described the two novels as creating a "double exposure," likening them to "a photograph taken once in shadow, once in light."

== Reception and legacy ==
The novel has been somewhat neglected, possibly overshadowed by the simultaneous debuts of Philip Roth, John Updike, and Richard Yates. By 1962, when critic Michael Robbins stated that Mrs. Bridge answered the question posed by writers and social critics regarding "what kind of people we are producing, what kinds of lives we are leading," the novel was already out of print. At that time, readers of College Composition and Communication were encouraged to write to the publisher to advocate for a reprint.

In 1982, when both Mrs. Bridge and Mr. Bridge were republished, Brooks Landon, writing in The Iowa Review, remarked that "Connell seems to have become one of those writers we know to respect but may not have read." Although it has remained relatively under the radar, writers and critics continue to praise its sensitivity and significance. Tom Cox, writing in The Guardian, described it as "one of the sharper novels about mid-20th-century domestic life."

Critic Mark Oppenheimer, writing in The Believer, referred to Mrs. Bridge as one of Connell's "three classics of WASP repression," alongside Mr. Bridge and The Connoisseur. American novelist James Patterson, who has cited Mrs. Bridge as the novel that most influenced him (a view shared by novelist Joshua Ferris), noted that it and Mr. Bridge "capture the sadness, and boredom, of the unexamined life" and praised Connell's compassion and precision.

British critic Matthew Dennison, who commended the novel's "studiedly simple, undecorated prose, with few rhetorical flourishes," compared Mrs. Bridge to Jan Struther's Mrs. Miniver. Both characters inhabit "an interwar world shaped by a promise of certainties — domestic, social, cultural, and sexual — which are never wholly realized and remain frustratingly elusive."

Over the years, Mrs. Bridge has continued to be taught in universities as part of modern literature, creative writing (particularly in discussions of the vignette form), and social and cultural theory curricula.

== Publication history ==
Mrs. Bridge began as a short story titled "The Beau Monde of Mrs. Bridge," which was published in the Fall 1955 issue of The Paris Review. Both Mrs. Bridge and Mr. Bridge were republished in the United States in 2005 by Shoemaker & Hoard in Washington, D.C. The novel's fiftieth anniversary in 2009 was marked by a special edition featuring photographs by Laurie Simmons and an introduction by Mark Oppenheimer.

Evan S. Connell stated that the character of India Bridge was based on his mother, Ruth, an eccentric woman who preferred to be called "Elton." Connell explained that his mother was dying of cancer at the time the novel was published in 1959 and that she never read the book. Like the family depicted in the novel, Connell grew up in Kansas City, specifically in the upper-middle-class Country Club District.
