= Evan S. Connell =

American writer (1924–2013)

- Connell as a Contact editor, 1962.
- Born: Evan Shelby Connell Jr. August 17, 1924; Kansas City, Missouri
- Died: January 10, 2013 (aged 88); Santa Fe, New Mexico
- Occupation: Writer
- Writing career
- Period: 1957–2013
- Genres: Fiction, non-fiction
- Notable works: Mrs. Bridge (1959); Mr. Bridge (1969); Son of the Morning Star (1985)

Evan Shelby Connell Jr. (August 17, 1924 – January 10, 2013) was an American novelist, short-story writer, essayist and author of epic historical works. He published under the name Evan S. Connell Jr (and sometimes simply Evan S. Connell).

In 2009, Connell was nominated for the Man Booker International Prize for lifetime achievement. On April 23, 2010, he won the Robert Kirsch Award from the Los Angeles Times for "a living author with a substantial connection to the American West, whose contribution to American letters deserves special recognition."

== Background ==
Connell was born in Kansas City, Missouri, the only son of Evan S. Connell Sr. (1890–1974), a physician, and Ruth Elton Connell. He had a sister Barbara (Mrs. Matthew Zimmermann), to whom he dedicated his novel Mrs. Bridge (1959). Connell grew up in the upper middle-class Country Club District of Kansas City, Missouri, and graduated from Southwest High School in 1941.

He entered Dartmouth College in the fall of 1941, but left in 1943 to become a pilot in the United States Navy. After the end of World War II, he entered the University of Kansas and graduated in 1947, with a B.A. in English. Connell studied creative writing at Columbia University in New York and Stanford University in California.

Connell never married. For many years he maintained a close but typically long-distance relationship with singer Gale Zoe Garnett. He lived and worked in San Francisco and Sausalito, California, from 1954 to 1989, and then moved to Santa Fe, New Mexico, when he remained until his death. Connell died on January 10, 2013, at an assisted-living facility in Santa Fe.

Connell was described as "...forever handsome. Lean and athletic", but quiet to the point of being mistaken for a mute at times. It is purported that he used his writing to engage with an intimacy he never found within his own life and certainly had never found as a child. Of his own life and habits Connell reportedly "always said he had the dullest life of any writer ever. There was nothing to discover or worry over."

== Career ==
Connell's novels Mrs. Bridge (1959) and Mr. Bridge (1969) are bittersweet, gently satirical portraits of a conventional, unimaginative upper middle-class couple living in Kansas City from the 1920s to the 1940s. The couple tries to live up to societal expectations and to be good parents, but they are sadly incapable of bridging the emotional distance between themselves and their children and between each other.

The pair of novels was adapted as a 1990 Merchant-Ivory motion picture, Mr. and Mrs. Bridge, starring Paul Newman and Joanne Woodward. Critics gave the film mostly positive reviews.

Connell's 1960 novel The Patriot is the story of Melvin Isaacs, aged 17, and his experiences in naval aviation school during the Second World War. Melvin faces the terrifying reality of training and the likelihood of his "washing out" (failing). Melvin's attempts to communicate the realities of his experience to his father are rebuffed. Though not well reviewed, The Patriot contains some rewarding social satire and impressive scenes of aviation.

In 1966, Connell's novel "The Diary of a Rapist," became a "tour de force," though it garnered feminist criticism for portraying the typical rapist as a strange and unusual kind of man. Susan Brownmiller characterized Connell's protagonist, Earl Summerfield, as a "timid" man with a "wretched, deprived sex life, and an older, nagging, ambitious, 'castrating' wife." "Connell's Diary," she continues, "contains almost every myth and misconception about rape and rapists that is held in the popular mind."

Connell's 1984 sweeping account of George Armstrong Custer and the Battle of the Little Bighorn, Son of the Morning Star, earned critical acclaim and was a bestseller. The book was adapted as a television miniseries in 1991 and won four Emmy Awards.

While Connell eventually received widespread recognition as a noteworthy literary figure, his relative obscurity during his most active periods has been put down to the fact that he was "[un]willing to suffer the indignities of book tours, interviews, promotional appearances, and editorial expectations." Connell also refused any university teaching post that was offered to him "and thus never cultivated a devoted coterie of students who would go off into the writing world and carry his banner." Decades into his career Connell remarked "My own experience indicates that it is mostly a career of rejection and lost illusions."

Dorothy Parker described Connell as "a writer of fine style and amazing variety".

== Legacy and honors ==
- 1959, Mrs. Bridge was a finalist for the National Book Award in fiction.
- 1974, Points for a Compass Rose was a finalist for the National Book Award in poetry.
- 2009, he was nominated for the third Man Booker International Prize for lifetime achievement.
- 2010, he received the Los Angeles Times Book Prize: the Robert Kirsch Award.

== Bibliography ==
Novels

- Mrs. Bridge (1959)
- The Patriot (1960)
- The Diary of a Rapist (1966)
- Mr. Bridge (1969)
- The Connoisseur (1974)
- Double Honeymoon (1976)

Short Fiction

- "I'll Take You To Tennessee," in Stanford Short Stories Nineteen Forty-Nine. Edited by Wallace Stegner. (1949)
- The Anatomy Lesson (1957)
- At The Crossroads (1965)
- "Here it is", in Why Work Series, editor Gordon Lish (1966)
- Saint Augustine's Pigeon: The Selected Stories of Evan S. Connell (1982)
- The Collected Stories of Evan S. Connell (1995)
- Lost in Uttar Pradesh (2008, ISBN 978-1-59376-175-2)

Non-Fiction

- A Long Desire: Essays (1979)
- White Lantern: Essays (1981)
- Son of the Morning Star: Custer and the Little Bighorn (1985, ISBN 0-88394-088-4)
- The Alchymist's Journal (1991, republished in 2006 as Alchymic Journals)
- Deus Lo Volt!: A Chronicle of the Crusades (2000, ISBN 1-58243-140-X)
- The Aztec Treasure House: New and Selected Essays (2001, ISBN 1-58243-253-8)(non-fiction)
- Francisco Goya: A Life (2004, ISBN 1-58243-307-0)

Poetry

- Notes from a Bottle Found on the Beach at Carmel (1962)
- Points for A Compass Rose (1973)
