= Battle of Fort McAllister =

Battle of Fort McAllister may refer to two battles at Fort McAllister on the Ogeechee River in Bryan County, Georgia, defending Savannah during the American Civil War:

- First Battle of Fort McAllister, naval attacks occurring January 27–March 3, 1863
- Second Battle of Fort McAllister, Union capture of the Fort on December 13, 1864, during Sherman's March to the Sea

== See also ==
- Fort McAllister Historic State Park
- Georgia in the American Civil War
