= Son of the Morning Star =

1984 book about the Battle of Little Bighorn

- Author: Evan S. Connell
- Language: English
- Genre: Non-fiction
- Publisher: North Point Press
- Publication date: 1984

Son of the Morning Star: Custer and the Little Big Horn is a nonfiction account of the Battle of the Little Bighorn on June 25, 1876, by novelist Evan S. Connell, published in 1984 by North Point Press. The book features extensive portraits of the battle's participants, including General George Armstrong Custer, Sitting Bull, Major Marcus Reno, Captain Frederick Benteen, Crazy Horse, and others.

Originally intending to write a book of essays about the history of the American West, Connell instead developed his essay about General Custer into a book-length examination of the battle and its combatants. Connell researched the book for four years, visiting the site of the battle four times and consulting previous books, soldier's diaries, and Indian accounts of the battle. After being rejected by several major New York publishers, the book was published by North Point Press, a small publisher in Berkeley, California, and it went on to become a bestseller.

The book was a critical success as well. Page Stegner in The New York Times said that the book was "impressive in its massive presentation of information" and added that "its prose is elegant, its tone the voice of dry wit, its meandering narrative skillfully crafted." The Washington Post's reviewer said that "Son of the Morning Star leaves the reader astonished," and The Wall Street Journal called it "a scintillating book, thoroughly researched and brilliantly constructed." It was named one of the five best nonfiction volumes of 1984 by the National Book Critics Circle and won the 1985 Los Angeles Times Book Prize for History.

In 1991, the book was adapted as a television miniseries, written by Melissa Mathison and directed by Mike Robe, and featuring Gary Cole as General Custer and Rodney A. Grant as Crazy Horse. An audiobook edition was released by Recorded Books in 1985, narrated by Adrian Cronauer.
