= William Ludlow =

American military officer and explorer

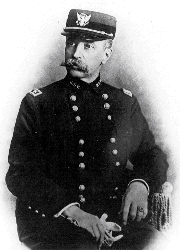
- Brigadier General William Ludlow, c. 1898
- Born: November 27, 1843; Islip, New York, US
- Died: August 30, 1901 (aged 57); Convent Station, New Jersey, US
- Burial place: Arlington National Cemetery
- Relatives: William H. Ludlow
- President: Grover Cleveland

Engineer Commissioner of the District of Columbia
- In office January 1, 1886 – May 21, 1889
- Preceded by: Garrett J. Lydecker
- Succeeded by: Charles Walker Raymond
- Military career
- Allegiance: United States of America
- Branch: United States Army
- Service years: 1864–1901
- Rank: Brigadier General (USA); Major General (USV)
- Unit: Corps of Engineers
- Conflicts: American Civil War; Indian Wars; Spanish–American War

William Ludlow (November 27, 1843 – August 30, 1901) was an officer in the Corps of Engineers and a major general in the United States Army who served in the Civil War, Plains Indian Wars, the Spanish–American War, and led a scientific expedition examining the natural wonders of Yellowstone National Park.

== Early life ==
Ludlow was born in Islip, New York, the son of William H. Ludlow and Frances Louisa Nicoll Ludlow. He received his education at University of the City of New York and the United States Military Academy. He graduated in 1864, during the height of the Civil War, and was commissioned in the Corps of Engineers.

== Civil War ==
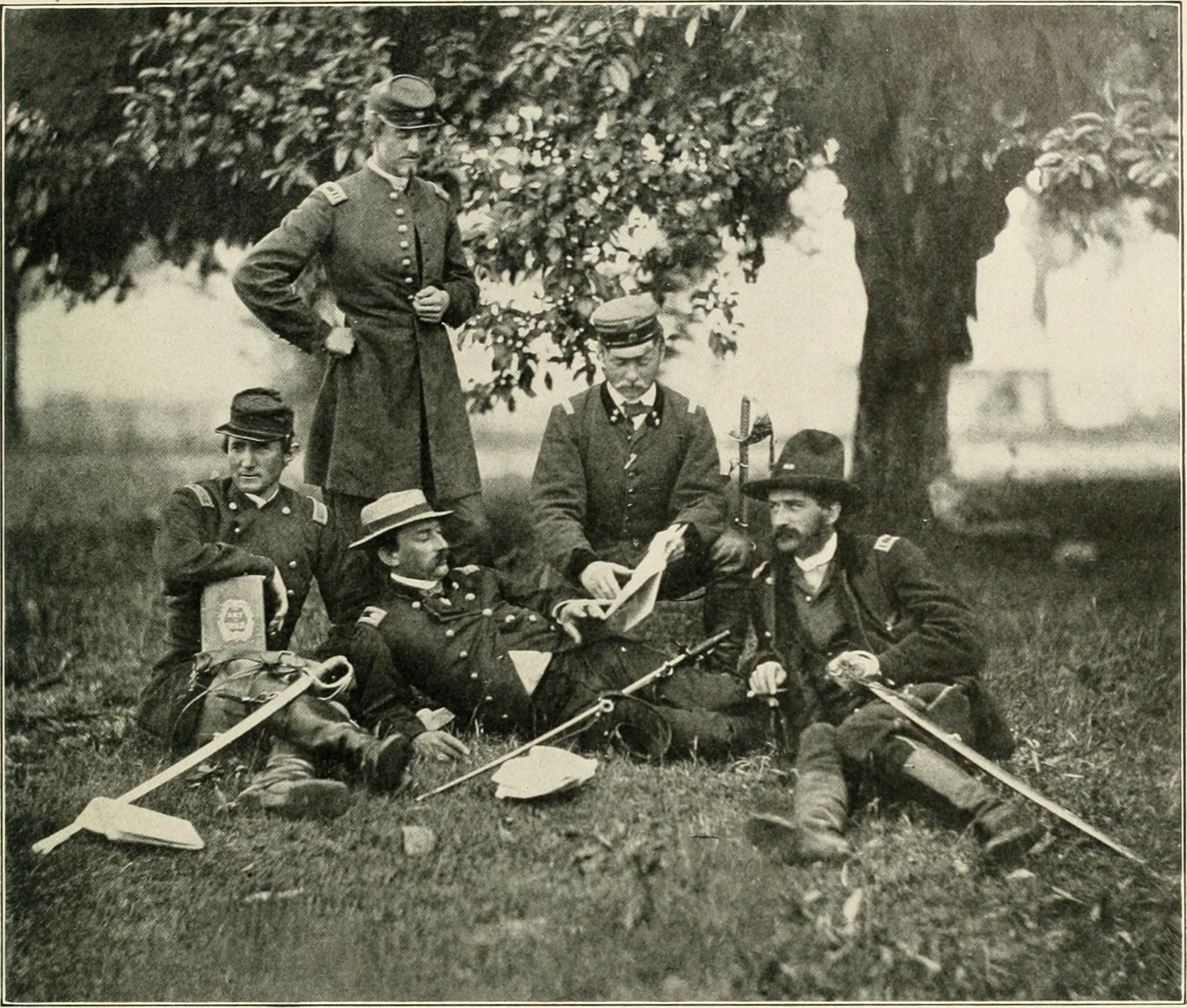
Officers chat during the Civil War. Major Benjamin Ludlow, William's brother, sits on left.

Ludlow served under Maj. Gen. Joseph Hooker in the Atlanta campaign, and was appointed a brevet captain for gallantry at the Battle of Peachtree Creek. He was on the staff of Maj. Gen. William T. Sherman in both the March to the Sea and the Carolinas campaign. In March 1865, he was appointed a brevet lieutenant colonel.

== Postbellum service ==
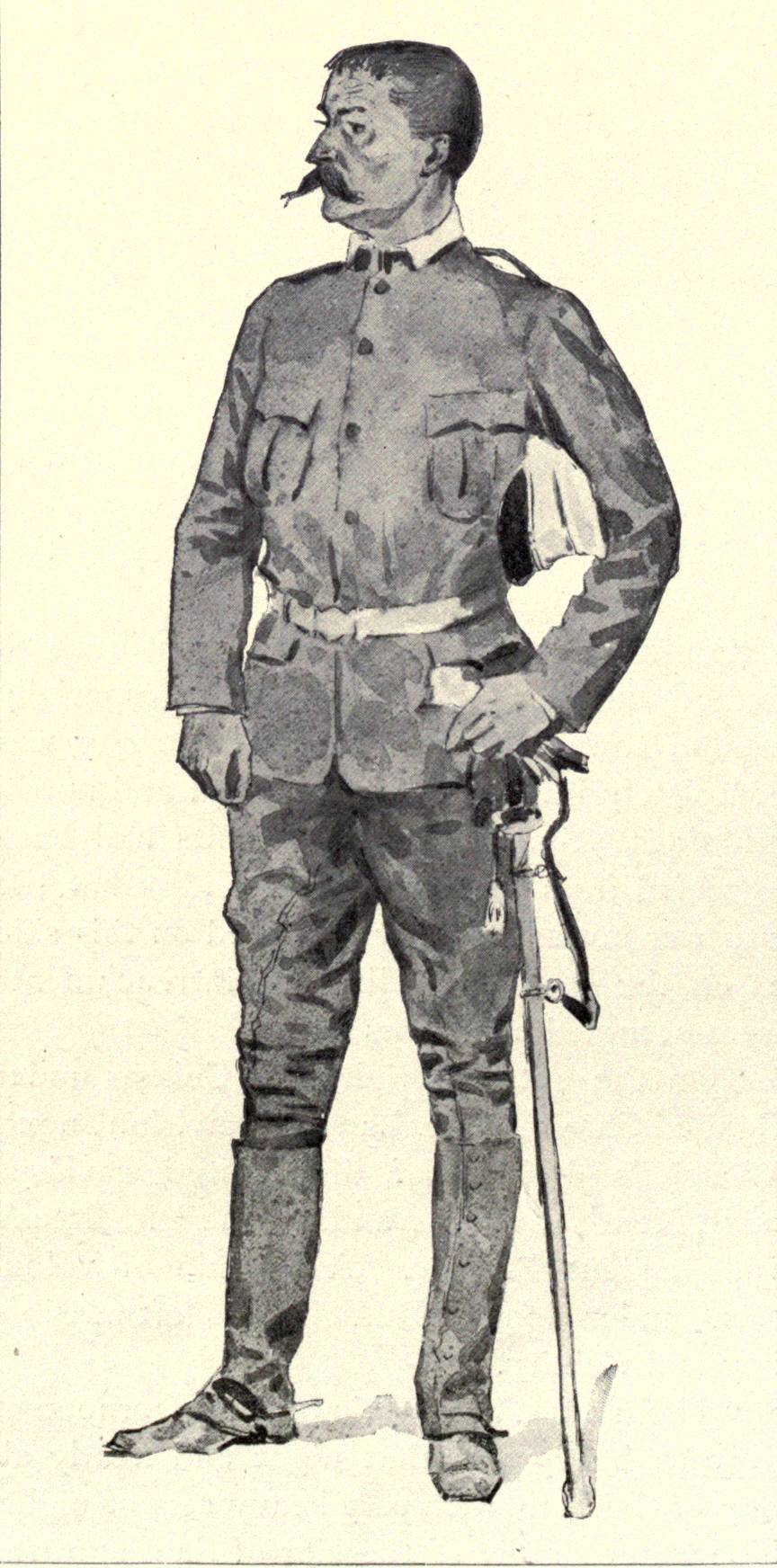
Brig. Gen. William Ludlow 1898

After the Civil War, Ludlow devoted his life to a military career, serving in engineering and scientific capacities in the Dakota Territory, Washington, D.C., and in river and harbor management in Philadelphia, the Great Lakes, Nicaragua and New York City. As Chief Engineer of Dakota Territory, he oversaw mapping and data collection of the 7th Cavalry's 1874 expedition into the Black Hills of what is now South Dakota. In 1884, he was elected as a member to the American Philosophical Society. In Washington, DC he was the military commissioner for the District of Columbia from 1886 to 1888. In May 1898, he was appointed a brigadier general of volunteers and Chief Engineer of the armies in the field. He commanded the 1st Brigade in Henry W. Lawton's division during the battle of El Caney and the siege of Santiago. Later he was the military governor of Santiago and commanded the Department of Havana. In September 1898, he was appointed a major general of volunteers. In April 1899, Ludlow was reduced in rank to brigadier general of volunteers. In January 1900, he was promoted to brigadier general in the regular army. In April 1901, Ludlow was sent to the Philippines. He briefly commanded the Department of the Visayas before being returned to the U.S. at the end of June 1901, due to the discovery of advancing pulmonary tuberculosis he had contracted in Cuba.

Ludlow died in Convent Station, New Jersey, on August 30, 1901, and is buried in Arlington National Cemetery.

In 1904, Washington, D.C., named William Ludlow Elementary School for him. It has since been combined with Zachary Taylor Elementary to form Ludlow-Taylor Elementary School.

== Integrity in service ==
A story published in an 1884 issue of the "Engineering News and American Contract Journal" featured Ludlow as an example of integrity in Army and civil service.

"That's a cool fellow," said an up-town manufacturer pointing across Chestnut Street, where Colonel [William] Ludlow, the Chief of the Water Department of Philadelphia, was waiting for a streetcar. "Let me tell you something that happened a few days ago to a friend of mine, whose large establishment consumes a great deal of water, and who has frequent favors to ask of the Water Department.

"He recently visited the Chief's office, and found Colonel Ludlow, as usual, very polite. My friend, before proffering all of his requests, took a $50 bank bill from his pocket and passed it over to the Chief, who examined it curiously for a second and then spread it upon the desk before him.

"He did not utter a word at the moment, but when his visitor was about to go away, said: 'Now, my dear sir, what is this for?' holding up the bill. 'Oh! That's to buy cigars for the boys,' was the careless reply. 'Yes,' said Ludlow, 'then I suppose that you are fond of the weed yourself?' My friend said that he enjoyed nothing better than a good cigar. 'Then allow me,' said the Colonel, suavely, 'to insist upon your trying one of these,' moving to a secretary and taking down a box of Henry Clay Specials.

"Each gentleman took a cigar and bit off the end. Then with a careless gesture Colonel Ludlow rolled up the $50 bill into a paper lighter, reached up to the gas, allowed it to become thoroughly ignited, and slowly lit his own cigar. This done, the Colonel turned with an easy and polite motion, and said: 'Permit me,' and held the blazing bill under the nose and up to the cigar of my amazed and startled friend, whose eyes had now become almost as big as dinner plates.

"When the bank note had been completely reduced to ashes the Colonel turned to his visitor and said carelessly: 'How do you like your cigar?' The gentleman admitted its excellence and took his departure, attended to the door by the Chief, who with the utmost courtesy shook him by the hand, and then closed the door to resume his work at his desk. My friend gets purple in the face every time he thinks of the affair, and confided it to me simply to warn me how to behave myself at the Water Department."

== In fiction ==
William Ludlow is featured in the novella Legends of the Fall by Jim Harrison and the 1994 film. In one scene (at 25 min, 24 sec), the book Report of a Reconnaissance of the Black Hills of Dakota (which is an actual book authored by the real William Ludlow) is shown and referred to as the work of the fictional William Ludlow. In the film he is portrayed by Anthony Hopkins.

== Named for ==
Ludlow, South Dakota, a tiny hamlet in northwestern South Dakota, is named for him.

== See also ==
- William H. Illingworth
