= Charley Reynolds =

American soldier (1842–1876)

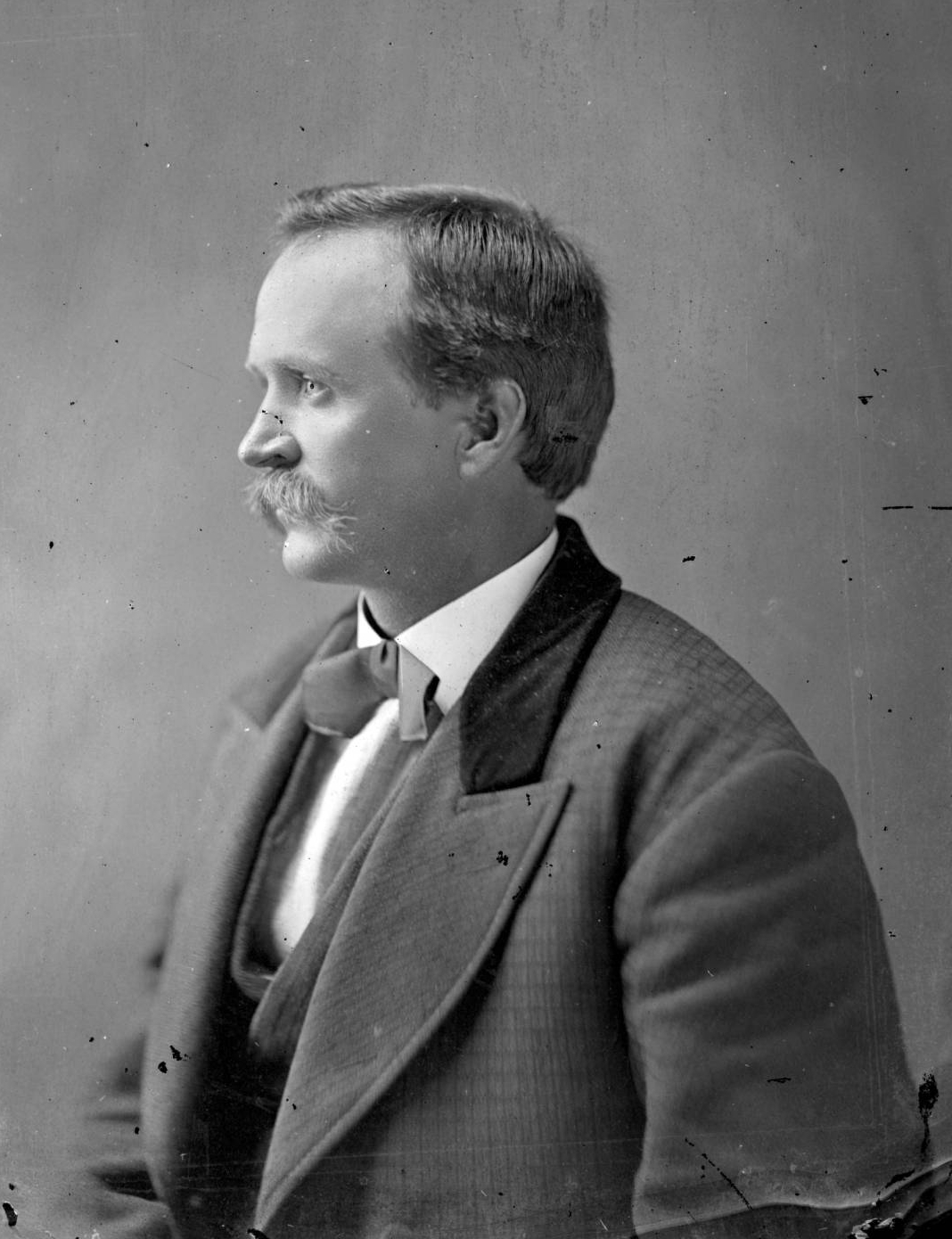
Charley Reynolds studio portrait

"Lonesome" Charley Reynolds (March 20, 1842–June 25, 1876) was a scout in the U.S. 7th Cavalry Regiment who was killed at the Battle of the Little Bighorn in the Montana Territory. He was noted as an expert marksman, frontiersman and hunter. He had also been a scout with Buffalo Bill.

== Biography ==
Charles Alexander Reynolds was born in Stephensburg, Kentucky. His family moved to Abingdon, Illinois, and he attended Abingdon College for 3 years. He was the son of a physician and moved with his family to Pardee, Kansas where his father had set-up his practice. Soon after, in 1860, he was hired to be a Pony Express rider. After the Pony Express, he in served Company B of the 10th Kansas Infantry Regiment during the Civil War.

After the war, he became known as "Lonesome" Charley Reynolds due to his drifting from state to state and job to job, and how he kept his life's details private. In 1865, he was a trader; in 1866, a buffalo hunter; and so on. In 1867, he had a quarrel with an Army officer at Fort McPherson, and when it was done, the officer only had one arm left.

Reynolds left that area and became a hunter and guide. He met George Armstrong Custer in 1869. He was soon a scout for Custer's U.S. 7th Cavalry Regiment. During Custer's 1874 Black Hills Expedition, he carried unaccompanied the dispatches to Fort Laramie that made the discovery of gold public.

The night before the Battle of the Little Bighorn, he had premonitions and gave away his personal items to the soldiers. As they were riding toward the Indian village prior to the battle, Reynolds, who never drank, asked interpreter Fred Gerard for some whiskey. He also indicated that he had never felt so discouraged or depressed in his life.

He was later killed in the battle. Some accounts suggest that he may have been defending a doctor who was treating a wounded soldier. His body was buried on the battlefield and his grave crudely marked. Later, as with all of Custer's slain soldiers and civilians, a white marble slab was erected to mark the spot where he fell. His remains, and those of his comrades, were collected and reinterred on Custer Hill. An obelisk commemorates the dead.
