= Comanche (disambiguation) =

The Comanche are a Native American ethnic group.

Comanche or Commanche may also refer to:

- Comanche language, a Uto-Aztecan language spoken by the Comanche people

== Aircraft ==
- Piper PA-24 Comanche, a single-engined monoplane
- Piper PA-30 Twin Comanche, a twin-engined monoplane
- Piper PA-39 Twin Comanche C/R, a PA-30 Twin Comanche variant with counter-rotating engines
- Boeing–Sikorsky RAH-66 Comanche, a prototype attack and reconnaissance stealth helicopter

== Comics ==
- Comanche (comics), a character in the Marvel Universe
- Comanche (comic book series), by Greg and Hermann Huppen

== Film and television ==
- Comanche (1956 film), directed by George Sherman
- Comanche (2000 film), written and directed by Burt Kennedy
- "Comanche", a 1959 episode of the Have Gun – Will Travel TV series
- Marty Comanche, a character on The Spoils of Babylon
- Tonka, a 1958 Disney film also released under the name "A Horse Named Comanche", starring Sal Mineo

== Horses ==
- Comanche (horse) (died 1891), reputed to be the only survivor of General George Armstrong Custer's detachment
- Commanche Court (1993–2009), an Irish Thoroughbred racehorse, sired by Comanche Run
- Commanche Run (1981–2005), a British Thoroughbred racehorse

== Music ==
- "Comanche", a 1959 instrumental by Link Wray
- "Comanche (The Brave Horse)", a 1960 song by Johnny Horton
- "Comanche", a 1961 song by The Revels
- "Comanche", a song from the 1971 album Negro é Lindo by Jorge Ben
- "Comanche", a song from the 1990 album Volume 10 by The Vibrators
- "Comanche", a song from the 1994 album Motorcade of Generosity by Cake
- "Comanche," a song from the 2012 album Blood by In This Moment
- Cesar Comanche, an American hip hop artist

== Places ==
=== Bolivia ===
- Comanche, Bolivia
- Comanche Municipality

=== Greenland ===
- Comanche Bay

=== United States ===
- Comanche County, Kansas
- Comanche Township, Barton County, Kansas
- Comanche, Montana
- Comanche, Oklahoma
- Comanche County, Oklahoma
- Comanche Point (Grand Canyon), a summit in Arizona
- Comanche, Texas
- Comanche County, Texas

== Other uses ==
- Comanche (video game series), computer games featuring the RAH-66 Comanche helicopter
  - Comanche: Maximum Overkill, the first game in the series
- Jeep Comanche, a pickup truck
- Wycombe Comanche, once mascot of Wycombe Wanderers Football Club
- Comanche (yacht), Racing sail boat

== See also ==
- Comanche Territory (disambiguation)
- Comanchero (disambiguation)
