= Joseph Lewis =

Joseph Lewis may refer to:

- Joseph Lewis Jr. (Virginia politician) (1772–1834), U.S. Representative from Virginia
- Joseph Lewis Jr. (Florida judge), Judge on the Florida First District Court of Appeal
- Joseph Horace Lewis (1824–1904), U.S. Representative from Kentucky
- Hungry Joe (Joseph Lewis, 1850–1902), American swindler and bunco man
- Joseph Lewis (secularist) (1889–1968), American author and president of Freethinkers of America
- Joseph H. Lewis (1907–2000), American B-movie director
- Joseph Lewis (cyclist) (born 1989), Australian cyclist
- Joseph Lewis (ice hockey) (born 1992), Welsh ice hockey player
- Joseph J. Lewis (1801–1883), IRS commissioner
- Bud Lewis (Joseph Lewis, 1908–2011), American golfer
- JT Lewis (Joseph Lewis, born 2000), American political candidate
- Trey Lewis (basketball) (Joseph Lewis III, born 1985), American basketball player
- Joseph Lewis (fur trader) (1772–1820), Black Canadian fur trader

== See also ==
- Joe Lewis (disambiguation)
- Joe Louis (disambiguation)
- Jerry Lewis
