= Bud Lewis =

Bud Lewis may refer to:

- Bud Lewis (golfer) (1908–2011), American golfer
- Bud Lewis (soccer) (born 1953), American soccer manager and former player

== See also ==
- Buddy Lewis (1916–2011), American baseball player
- Buddy Lewis (comedian) (born 1963), American comedian
