= Joe Louis (disambiguation) =

Joe Louis (1914–1981) was an American world heavyweight boxing champion.

Joe Louis may also refer to:

- Joe Louis (puppeteer) (Sakorn Yang-keawsot, 1922–2007), Thai dancer and puppeteer
- Joe Louis (horse), a horse owned by the United States Army
- Joe Hill Louis (1921–1957), American musician

== See also ==
- Joe Louis Arena in Detroit
- Jos Louis, chocolate pastry
- Joe Lewis (disambiguation)
- Joseph Lewis (disambiguation)
