= Comanchero (disambiguation) =

The Comanchero were primarily Hispanic traders from New Mexico.

Comanchero or The Comancheros may refer also to:

- "Comanchero" (song), by Moon Ray (Raggio Di Luna)
- Comanchero Motorcycle Club, an Australian outlaw gang
- The Comancheros (film), a 1961 Western

== See also ==
- Comanche (disambiguation)
