= Chief (horse) =

U.S. army cavalry mount

- Species: Horse
- Sex: Gelding
- Born: 1932
- Died: May 24, 1968 (aged 35–36)
- Resting place: Fort Riley, Kansas, United States
- Occupation: Cavalry horse
- Employer: United States Army
- Known for: Last operational cavalry mount of the U.S. Army
- Title: Advanced Cavalry Charger
- Height: 15.25 hands
- Appearance: Bay

Chief (1932–1968) was a horse owned by the United States Army. He has been credited as the Army's last living operational cavalry mount. Mustered into service in 1940 in Nebraska, Chief was posted to Fort Riley and served with the 9th and 10th Cavalry Regiments before being sent to the U.S. Army Cavalry School. In 1949–1950, he was retired and put out to pasture; he died in 1968.

== Early life and military service ==
Chief was foaled in 1932 and added to the cavalry muster roll in 1940 at Fort Robinson, having been purchased that year from L. A. Robinson of Scottsbluff, Nebraska, for $163. He was bay with white markings, standing 15.1 hands (155 cm) high and weighing 1,030 pounds (470 kg). Chief was described as an "all around good cavalry horse" who was especially skilled at jumping, and was popular and well-liked among cavalry troopers.

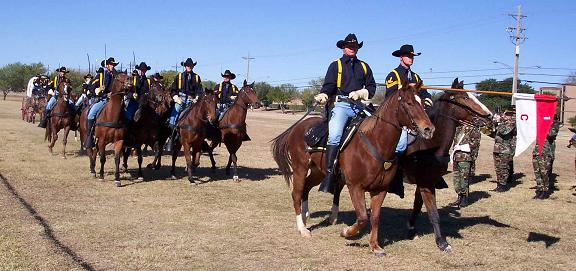
Though the U.S. Army continues to field equestrian units for ceremonial purposes, Chief was the last combat cavalry charger.

In 1941, Chief was posted to Fort Riley and assigned to the 10th Cavalry Regiment, though was later transferred to the 9th Cavalry Regiment. In June 1942 he was transferred, again, to the U.S. Army Cavalry School and promoted to Advanced Cavalry Charger.

== Retirement ==
At the conclusion of World War II, the United States Army terminated its main equestrian training program; between 1949 and 1950, horses under age 16 were sold at auction while older horses, numbering around 100 and including Chief, were put to pasture. Chief lived the rest of his life at the Fort Riley Riding Club where he was given a double box stall and private corral.

Chief achieved an advanced age, outliving all of the Army's other surplus cavalry chargers; he was preceded in death by Joe Louis and Gambler. By 1962, planning had begun for his eventual funeral, though his keeper, Sergeant First Class Robert Parker, reported that year that the horse remained athletic and that many visitors guessed he was significantly younger than his actual age. His last caretaker was Texas A&M alumnus Ron Haley.

== Death and funeral ==
Chief died on May 24, 1968, and was interred in an upright position at the base of Fort Riley's Old Trooper statue. The following week, on June 1, he was given a military funeral with full honors, the ceremony attended by approximately 500 mourners. He is one of four horses in United States history to be buried with military honors, the others being Black Jack, Reckless and Comanche.

== Legacy ==
Chief has been credited as the last living operational cavalry mount owned by the U.S. Army.

Since Chief's death, the United States Army has continued to field horse-mounted units for non-combat, ceremonial purposes. However, the United States Air Force's "Task Force Dagger" has engaged in horse-mounted combat, and the U.S. Marine Corps resumed equestrian combat training in the 2010s.

== See also ==
- United States Cavalry
