= Black Jack (horse) =

Ceremonial horse

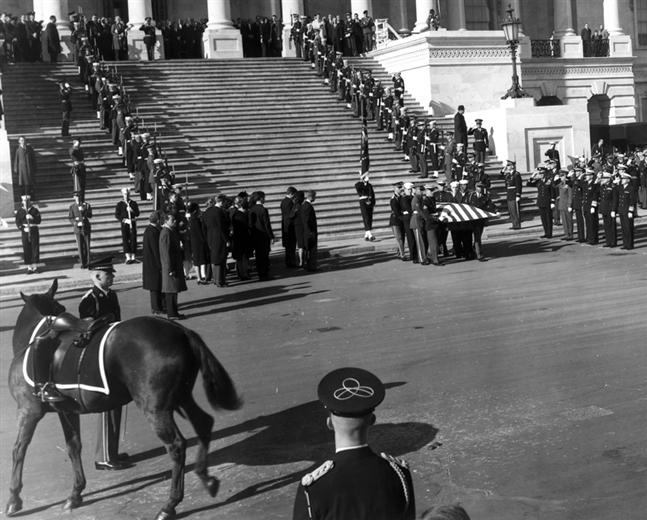
- Black Jack (lower left) in John F. Kennedy's funeral procession
- Species: Horse (Equus ferus caballus)
- Sex: Male
- Born: January 19, 1947
- Died: February 6, 1976 (aged 29)
- Resting place: Fort Myer, Virginia
- Nationality: American
- Occupation: Riderless horse
- Named after: John J. Pershing

Black Jack (January 19, 1947 – February 6, 1976) was an American riderless horse. He served in the Caisson Platoon of the 3rd U.S. Infantry Regiment (The Old Guard). He was the riderless horse in more than 1,000 Armed Forces Full Honors Funerals (AFFHF), the majority of which were in Arlington National Cemetery. With boots reversed in the stirrups, he was a symbol of a fallen leader, and was recognized for his "service to the nation" by U.S. President Richard Nixon on January 19, 1976.

Black Jack was purchased by Jacqueline Kennedy, widow to U.S. President John F. Kennedy, upon Black Jack's retirement on June 1, 1973.

== Early life ==
Black Jack was foaled January 19, 1947; was named in honor of U.S. Army General John J. "Black Jack" Pershing; (Note: Some sources list Black Jack as having been named for U.S. Army General John J. "Black Jack" Pershing, but this could be confusion with "General Pershing", who was "a large black Morgan stallion standing 15 3/4 hands tall and foaled in Iowa in 1930", and who was also named for John J. Pershing, according to the American Morgan Horse Association.) and came to Fort Myer from the cavalry remount station at Fort Reno, Oklahoma, on November 22, 1952. He was a 15.1 hands (61 inches, 155 cm) black Morgan-American Quarter Horse cross, (Note: Black Jack's exact breeding and pedigree is unknown due to some U.S. Army Remount sites only keeping records of "dead horses", but several sources list him as a "Morgan/American Quarter Horse mix", possibly sired by a Morgan stallion on loan from the U.S. Morgan Horse Farm, now the University of Vermont Morgan Horse Farm. By 1941, there were only 15 Morgan stallions being used by the U.S. Army Remount Service, according to 'The Morgan Horse Bulletin'. However, no Morgan stallions were recorded in Oklahoma or at Fort Reno at that time; three (3) Morgan stallions were recorded as being used by the Remount Service at Fort Riley, Kansas. Article 'The Remount Morgans of Fort Robinson' by Merideth M. Sears also states the following, based on archival documents from the Fort Robinson Nebraska Historical Site: "Morgan remount studs...were not well-accepted by the military hierarchy. [...] One [reason] was that the military was used to the fast, early maturity of the Thoroughbred breed, and did not realize that Morgans can take up to five years to fully develop...they were 'too small'... [...] Horses...were not generally bred to blooded, registered horses, but to grade mares, ranging from crossbred draft mares to Arabians." Black Jack's height, color, conformation, and temperament also match records of many Morgan stallions used at Fort Robinson.). Black Jack was the last of the Quartermaster–issue horses branded with the Army's U.S. brand (on the left shoulder) and his Army serial number 2V56 (on the left side of his neck), as the horse breeding program at Fort Reno was transferred from the U.S. Department of Defense to the U.S. Department of Agriculture (USDA) in May 1947 with bill H.R. 3484 and Public Law 80–494. In 1949, Oklahoma State University took over the program, and continues to breed American Quarter Horses and American Paint Horses at the Charles and Linda Cline Equine Teaching Center as part of the Ferguson College of Agriculture.

== Career ==
Black Jack served for 21 years of formal duty.

During his career, Black Jack participated in the following state funerals:

- Presidents:
  - John F. Kennedy (1963)
  - Herbert Hoover (1964)
  - Lyndon B. Johnson (1973)
- Five-star general:
  - Douglas MacArthur (1964)

Army Major General Philip C. Wehle was the Commanding General of the Military District of Washington during those state funerals, except for Johnson's. For Johnson's funeral, Army Major General James Bradshaw Adamson was serving as commanding general. Just after Johnson's funeral Black Jack was retired.

== Death and burial ==
Black Jack died after a 29-year military career on February 6, 1976. He was cremated, with his remains laid to rest with full military honors in a plot at Fort Myer, Virginia, on Summerall Field; his final resting place lies 200 feet (60 m) northeast of the flagpole in the southeast corner of the parade field.

He is one of four horses in United States history to be buried with Full Military Honors:

1. Black Jack
2. Chief, the US Army's last living operational cavalry mount at the time of his death,
3. Sergeant Reckless, a highly-decorated packhorse who served in the Korean War, and
4. Comanche, one of the only survivors of the Battle of Little Bighorn.

== See also ==
- Old Bob, Abraham Lincoln's horse who participated in Lincoln's funeral
- Sardar, another horse owned by Jacqueline Kennedy Onassis
- List of historical horses
