= Joe Lewis =

Joe Lewis may refer to:

- Joe Lewis (baseball) (1895–1986), American Negro league baseball player
- Joe E. Lewis (1902–1971), American comedian
- Joe Lewis (businessman) (born 1937), British currency trader and businessman
- Joe Lewis (martial artist) (1944–2012), American martial artist
- Joe Lewis (artist) (born 1953), American visual artist, photographer, musician, and art critic
- Joe Lewis (footballer, born 1987), English football goalkeeper
- Joe Lewis (footballer, born 1999), Welsh football defender

== See also ==
- Joe Louis (disambiguation)
  - Joe Louis (1914–1981), American boxer
- Joseph Lewis (disambiguation)
