= Philip C. Wehle =

United States Army general (1906–1978)

Philip Campbell Wehle
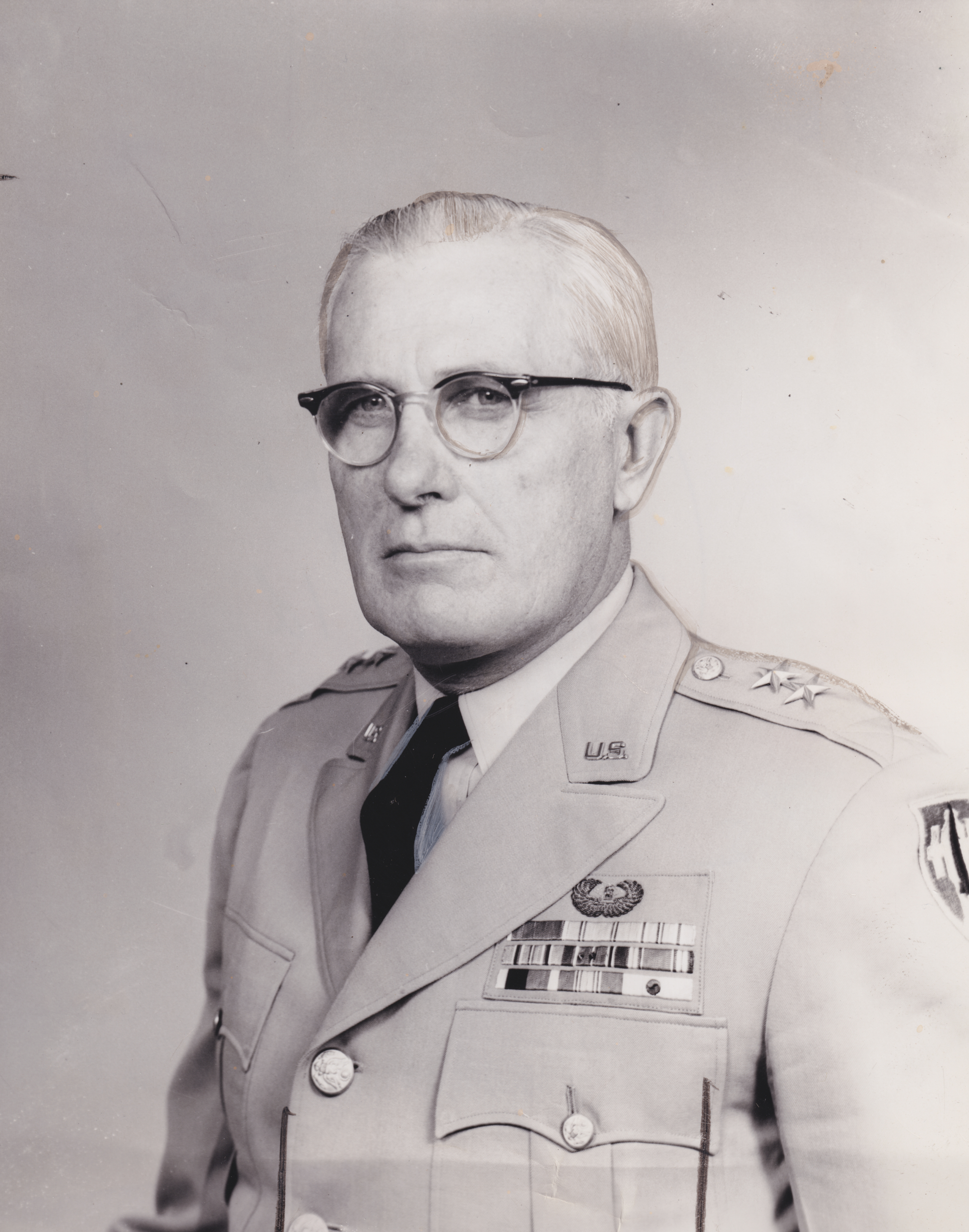
- Wehle as Commanding General of the Fort Polk U.S. Army Training Center c. 1963
- Born: September 5, 1906; Westport, Connecticut, US
- Died: September 20, 1978 (aged 72); Washington, D.C., US
- Military career
- Allegiance: United States of America
- Branch: United States Army
- Service years: 1930-1965
- Rank: Major General
- Service number: 0-18067
- Commands: Military District of Washington
- Conflicts: World War II; Cold War
- Awards: Distinguished Service Medal; Legion of Merit

Philip Campbell Wehle (September 5, 1906 – September 20, 1978) was a major general in the U.S. Army and the commanding general of the Military District of Washington (MDW) (CG MDW) from 1963 to 1965.

== Biography ==
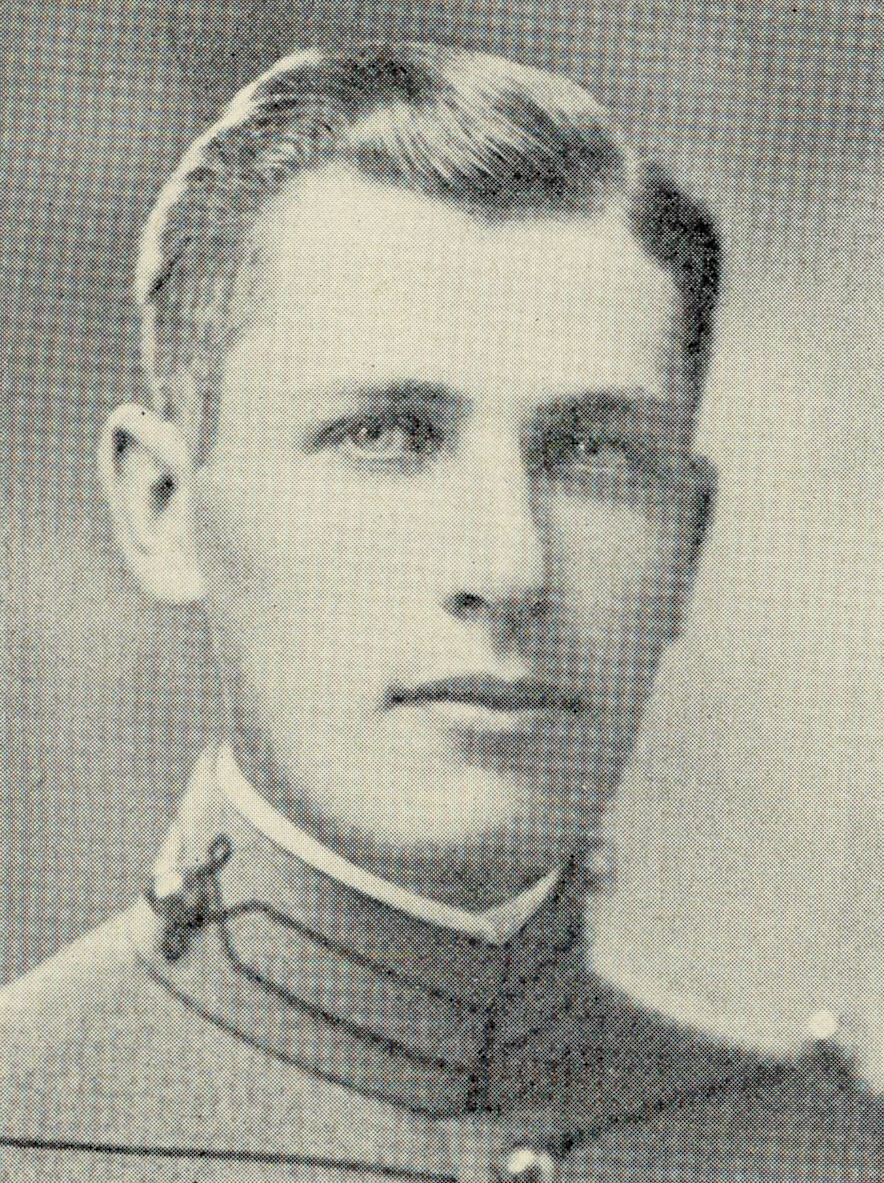
As a West Point cadet

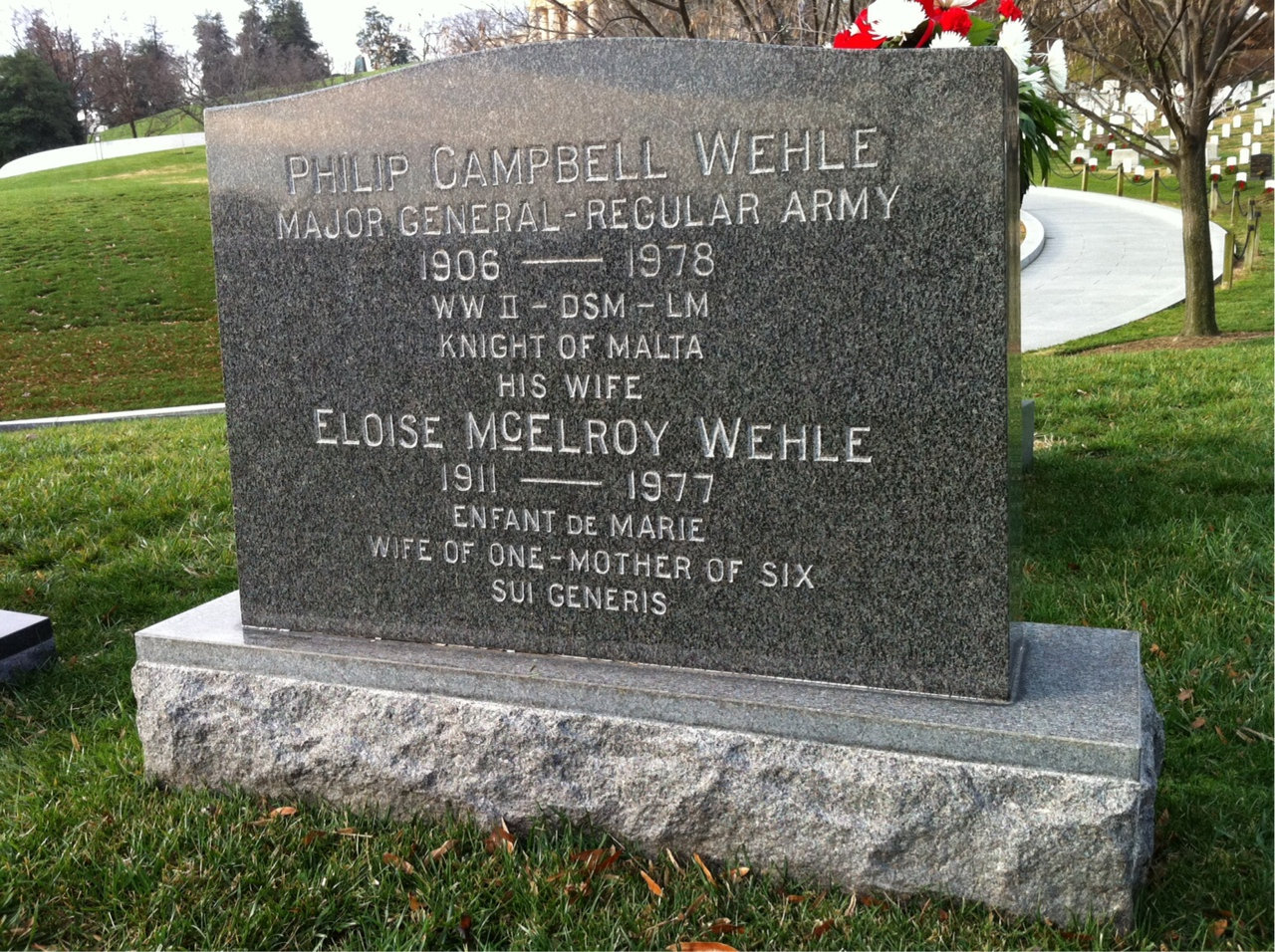
Grave at Arlington National Cemetery

Wehle was born in Westport, Connecticut, the son of John William Wehle, Sr. and Catherine Veronica Campbell Wehle. His older brother, John William Wehle, Jr. rose to Brigadier General in the Marines Corps. The boys were raised in Norwalk.

He graduated from Norwalk High School in 1924 then attended West Point, graduating in the Class of 1930 in June.

During World War II, Wehle served a tour of duty in the Pacific Theater of Operations, where he was attached to the first Joint Army-Navy Task Force.

After his return to the United States, Wehle was transferred to Camp Hale, Colorado, where he was appointed commanding officer of an artillery battalion. He was subsequently assigned to the staff of the XVIII Airborne Corps at Fort Bragg, North Carolina, as an assistant artillery officer.

He next participated in the Battle of the Bulge, Rhineland Campaign and the Central European Campaign. For his service in this capacity, Colonel Wehle was decorated with the Legion of Merit.

After the Second World War, he served with the Allied Occupation Forces in Heidelberg, Germany, and subsequently in the Plans Section until 1949.

He was later appointed the Secretary of the General Staff, Army Field Forces Headquarters at Fort Monroe, Virginia. In 1950, Wehle was transferred back to Europe, to serve as chief of the personnel branch of United States Army, Europe.

Returning to the United States, Wehle graduated from the Army War College in 1953.

In August 1963, Wehle was appointed the commanding general of the Military District of Washington. As CG MDW, he helped plan three state funerals, all of which happened within a span of 12 months:

- Presidents:
  - John F. Kennedy (November 1963)
  - Herbert Hoover (October 1964)
- Five-star general:
  - Douglas MacArthur (April 1964)

All three state funerals General Wehle helped plan had one thing in common: the riderless horse was Black Jack. Black Jack would be the riderless horse in one more state funeral: that of President Lyndon B. Johnson in 1973.

For his service as the Commanding General of the Military District of Washington, Major General Wehle was decorated with the Army Distinguished Service Medal.

He subsequently retired from the Army on September 19, 1965.

Following his retirement, Wehle worked on the staff of the Research and Analysis Corporation in McLean, Virginia. He later taught English language and History at the Heights School in Washington, D.C.

Major General Philip C. Wehle died on September 20, 1978, at Walter Reed Army Hospital, following complications from lung cancer.

He was interred together with his wife Eloise McElroy Wehle (1911-1977) in Arlington National Cemetery.

== Decorations ==
Here is the ribbon bar of Major General Wehle:

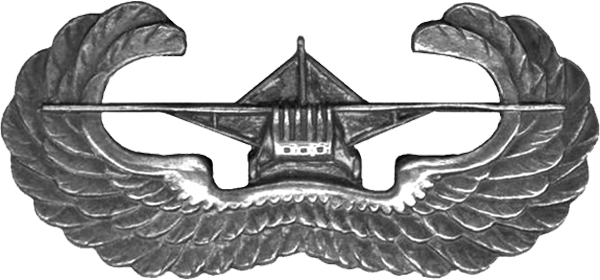

1st Row	Army Distinguished Service Medal			Legion of Merit
2nd Row	American Defense Service Medal	American Campaign Medal	Asiatic–Pacific Campaign Medal with one service star	European-African-Middle Eastern Campaign Medal with four service stars
3rd Row	World War II Victory Medal	Army of Occupation Medal	National Defense Service Medal with Oak Leaf Cluster	South Korean Order of Military Merit, 2nd Class
Glider Badge
