= Tonka (film) =

1958 film by Lewis R. Foster

- Theatrical release poster
- Directed by: Lewis R. Foster
- Written by: David Appel; Lewis R. Foster; Lillie Hayward
- Based on: Comanche: Story of America's Most Heroic Horse by David Appel
- Produced by: James C. Pratt
- Starring: Sal Mineo; Philip Carey; Jerome Courtland; Rafael Campos
- Cinematography: Loyal Griggs
- Edited by: Ellsworth Hoagland
- Music by: Oliver Wallace
- Color process: Technicolor
- Production company: Walt Disney Productions
- Distributed by: Buena Vista Distribution
- Release date: December 25, 1958
- Running time: 97 minutes
- Country: United States
- Language: English
- Box office: $2.5 million (est. US/ Canada rentals)

Tonka is a 1958 American Western film directed by Lewis R. Foster and starring Sal Mineo as a Sioux who survived the Battle of the Little Big Horn. The film is based on the book Comanche: Story of America's Most Heroic Horse by David Appel, and depicts the fictional story of the Indian and US Cavalry owners of the horse of the title.

It was filmed in Bend, Oregon, and distributed by Buena Vista Distribution, a division of Walt Disney Productions.

== Plot ==
In 1876, White Bull, a young Sioux, captures a wild stallion he names Tonka, and trains him. He must give the horse to his bad-tempered cousin, Yellow Bull, who abuses Tonka to break his spirit. White Bull lets the horse escape, and Tonka is captured by the U.S. Cavalry. Captain Myles Keogh rides Tonka at the Battle of Little Big Horn, and the horse is the only survivor of the massacre. When Captain Keogh is killed Tonka rises up and kills Keogh's killer. White Bull joins the cavalry, and is given the duty of looking after Tonka, who has received an honorable discharge from further battle duties.

== Cast ==
- Sal Mineo as White Bull
- Philip Carey as Captain Myles Keogh
- Jerome Courtland as Lieutenant Henry Nowlan
- Rafael Campos as Strong Bear
- H. M. Wynant as Yellow Bear
- Joy Page as Prairie Flower
- Britt Lomond as General George Custer
- Herbert Rudley as Captain Frederick Benteen
- Sydney Smith as General Alfred Terry
- John War Eagle as Chief Sitting Bull
- Gregg Martell as Corporal Korn
- Slim Pickens as Ace
- Robert "Buzz" Henry as Lieutenant Crittenden
- Eddie Little Sky as Spotted Tail

== Production ==
Tonka was filmed in Bend, Madras, Oregon.and Warm Springs, Oregon.

== See also ==
- List of films about horses
