= Terry Brown (museum conservator) =

American museum conservator-restorer

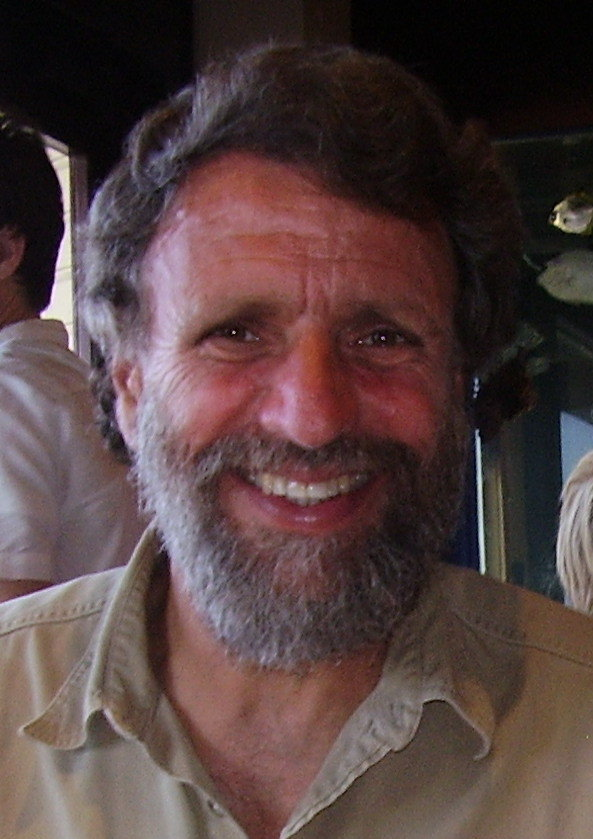
- Brown in 2011
- Born: April 23, 1953 (age 71)
- Occupation: Museum conservator

Terry Lee Brown (born April 23, 1953) is an American specialist in museum conservation and restoration. He is the owner of Museum Professionals, a Minnesota company that designs exhibits and restores artifacts at museums, visitor centers and nature centers.

Brown was a taxidermist for 20 years prior to co-founding the Loretto, Minnesota-based Museum Professionals in 1997. He designs dioramas, wildlife models and artifact mounts.

Brown has worked with numerous museums creating exhibits featuring natural settings, fauna and flora. He mounted a wandering albatross with a 12-foot wingspan for the University of Iowa Museum of Natural History and worked on a robotic Tyrannosaurus rex exhibit at the Sternberg Museum at Fort Hays State University in 2002. He also worked with the University of Kansas Natural History Museum on the restoration of Comanche, a horse who survived the Battle of the Little Bighorn.

Through his restorations, Brown has handled some 5000 artifacts from around the world during his career, including the leg braces of Franklin D. Roosevelt, a prehistoric Zygorhiza whale skull, a dodo, and a buffalo skull that belonged to Sitting Bull. He has worked with the Bell Museum of Natural History in Minneapolis, the African American Museum of Iowa, Chicago's Shedd Aquarium, and the Robert J. Dole Institute of Politics, among many others.

In July 2020, Brown and his wife finished installing a 65-foot exhibit for the main hall of the Indian Creek Nature Center in Cedar Rapids, Iowa. They later participated in the clean up of storm damage to the center's Wood Duck Way trail following August's severe derecho.

Brown was born on April 23, 1953, to Clyde and Shirley Brown. He married Paula Glick on August 23, 1980. They live in Hennepin County, Minnesota.
