= Comanche Point (Grand Canyon) =

Landform in the Grand Canyon, Arizona

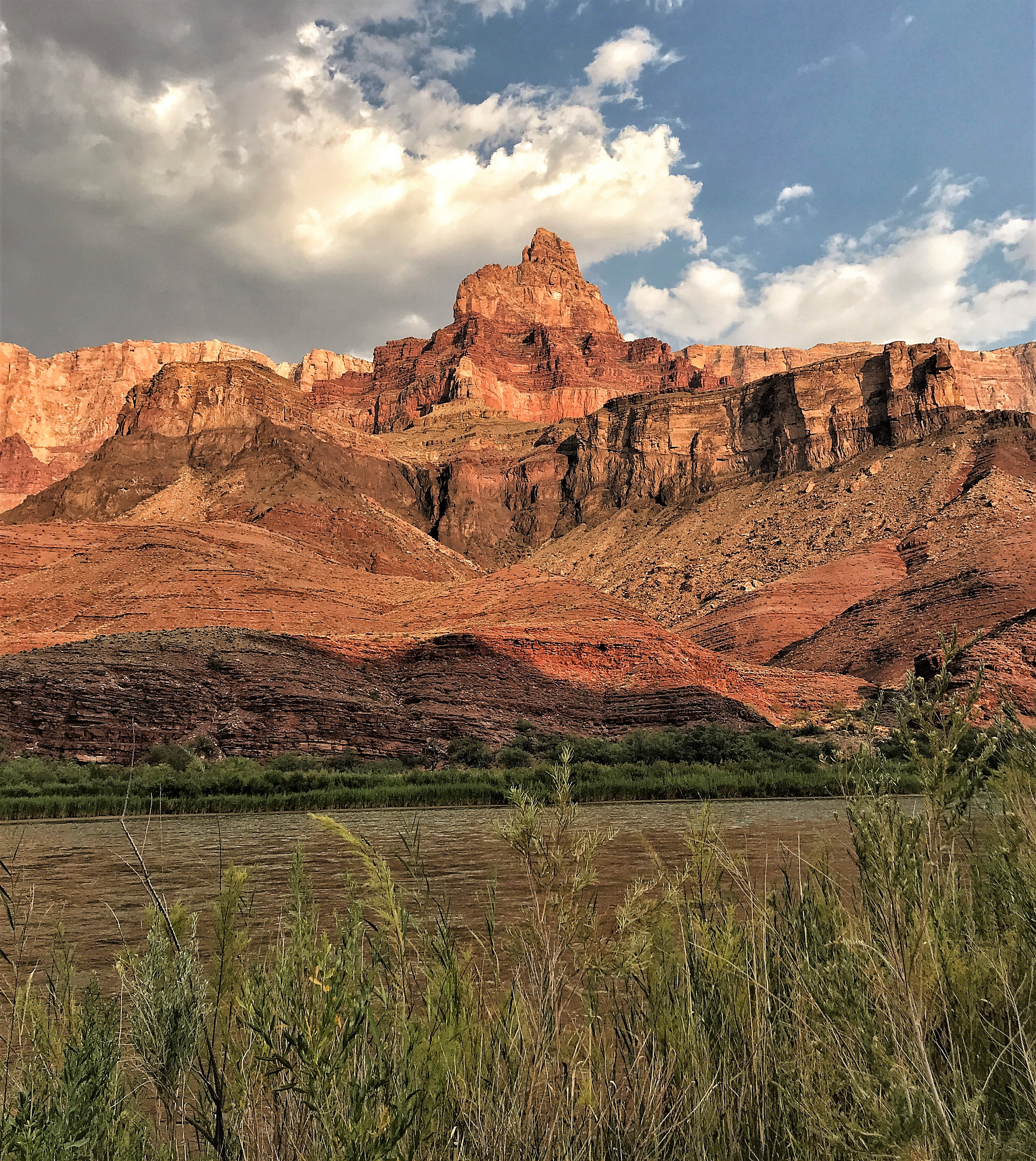
- West aspect from river level

Highest point
- Elevation: 7,073 ft (2,156 m)
- Prominence: 551 ft (168 m)
- Parent peak: Desert View Point (7,498 ft)
- Isolation: 3.91 mi (6.29 km)
- Coordinates: 36°05′33″N 111°48′12″W

Geography
- Location within Arizona Location within the United States
- Country: United States
- State: Arizona
- County: Coconino
- Protected area: Grand Canyon National Park
- Parent range: Coconino Plateau; Colorado Plateau
- Topo map: USGS Desert View

Geology
- Rock type(s): limestone, sandstone, siltstone

Climbing
- Easiest route: class 2

Comanche Point is a 7,073-foot-elevation (2,156-meter) summit located in the Grand Canyon, in Coconino County of northern Arizona, US. Part of the Palisades of the Desert, Comanche Point is the high point on the canyon's less-visited East Rim, and is four miles north-northeast of Desert View Point, its nearest higher neighbor. Topographic relief is significant as it towers 4,400 feet (1,300 meters) above the Colorado River in 1.5 mile. Comanche Point was named in 1900 by George Wharton James for the Comanche, a Native-American nation from the Great Plains, in keeping with a practice of naming the points on the canyon's South Rim for Native American nations. This geographical feature's name was officially adopted in 1906 by the U.S. Board on Geographic Names. According to the Köppen climate classification system, Comanche Point is located in a Cold semi-arid climate zone. On September 27, 1994, the tabloid Weekly World News ran an outlandish cover story that wreckage of a 4000-year-old UFO had been found in limestone rubble near the base of Comanche Point.

== Geology ==
The summit of Comanche Point is composed of Kaibab Limestone overlaying cream-colored, cliff-forming, Permian Coconino Sandstone. The sandstone, which is the third-youngest of the strata in the Grand Canyon, was deposited 265 million years ago as sand dunes. Below the Coconino Sandstone is slope-forming, Permian Hermit Formation, which in turn overlays the Pennsylvanian-Permian Supai Group. Further down are strata of Mississippian Redwall Limestone, and Cambrian Tonto Group. Precipitation runoff from Comanche Point drains into the nearby Colorado River.

== Gallery ==
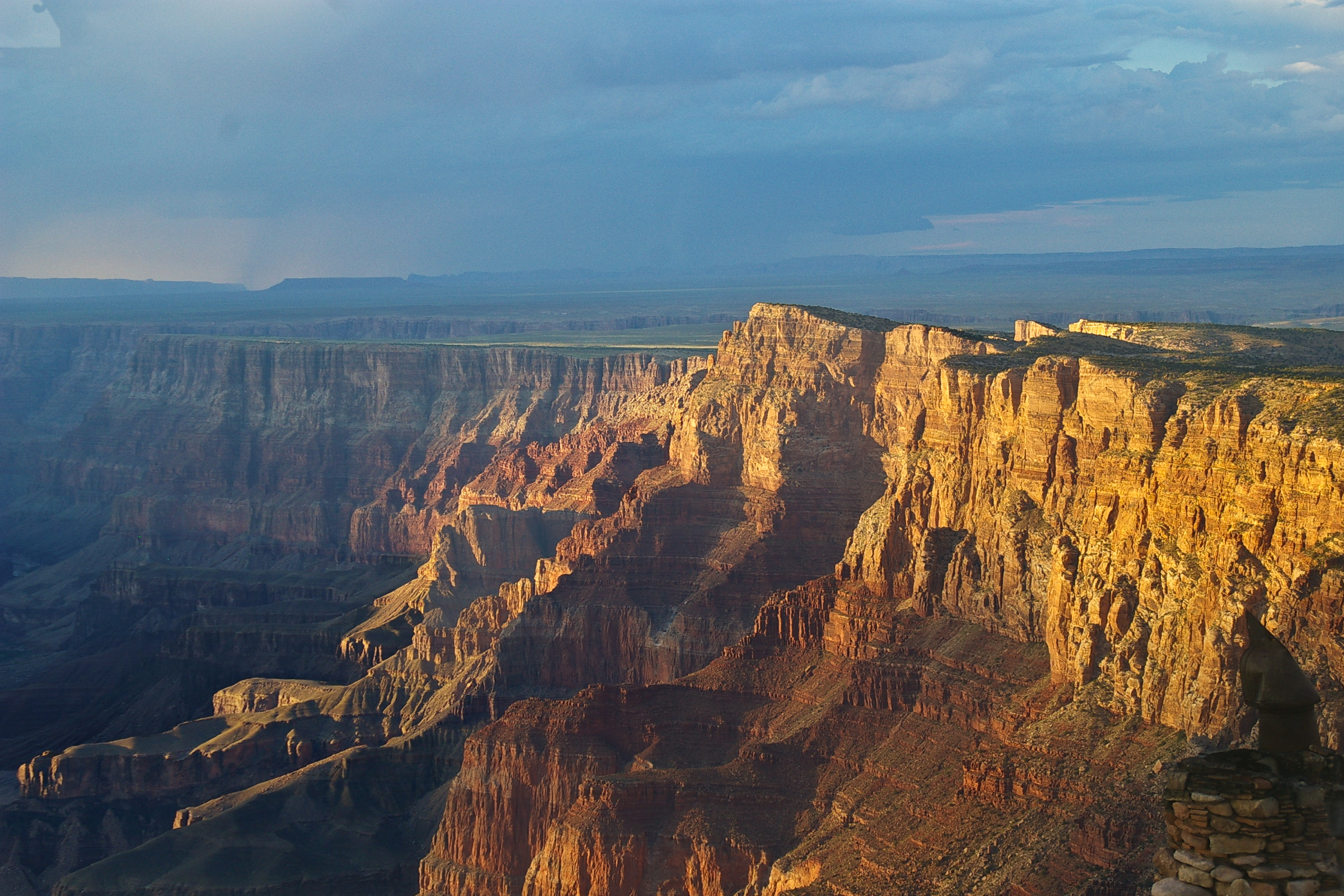
From Desert View

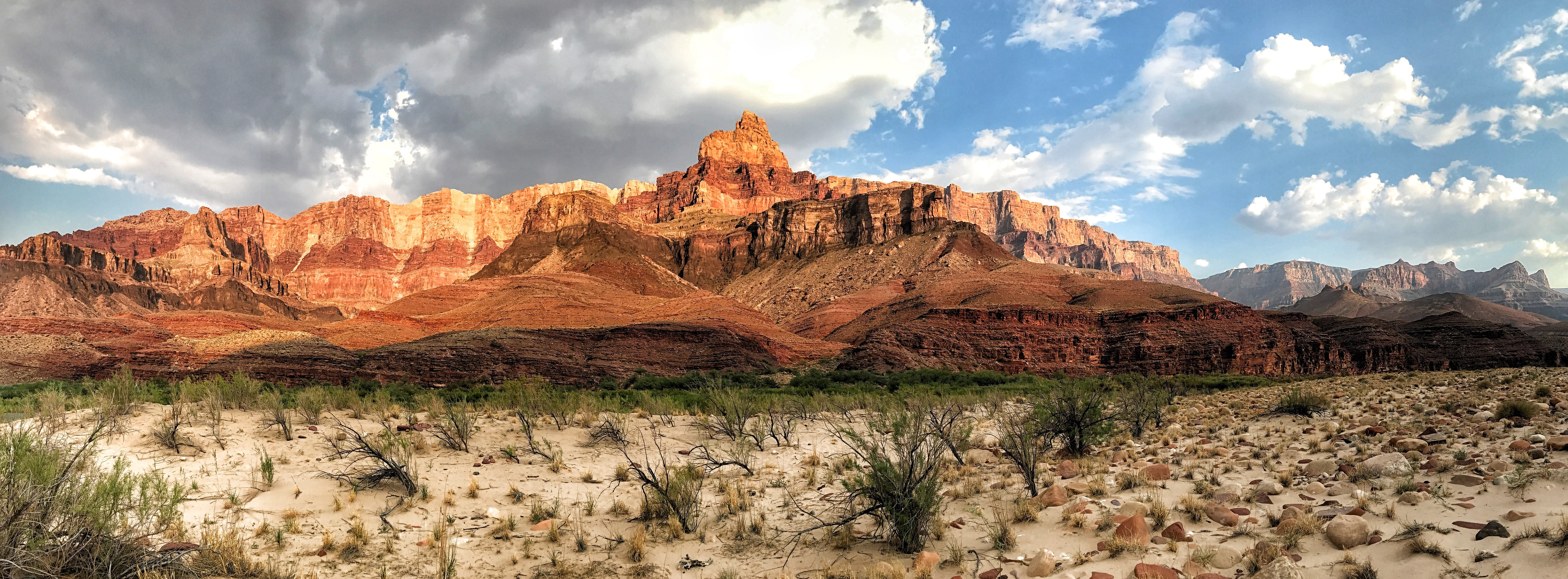
West aspect

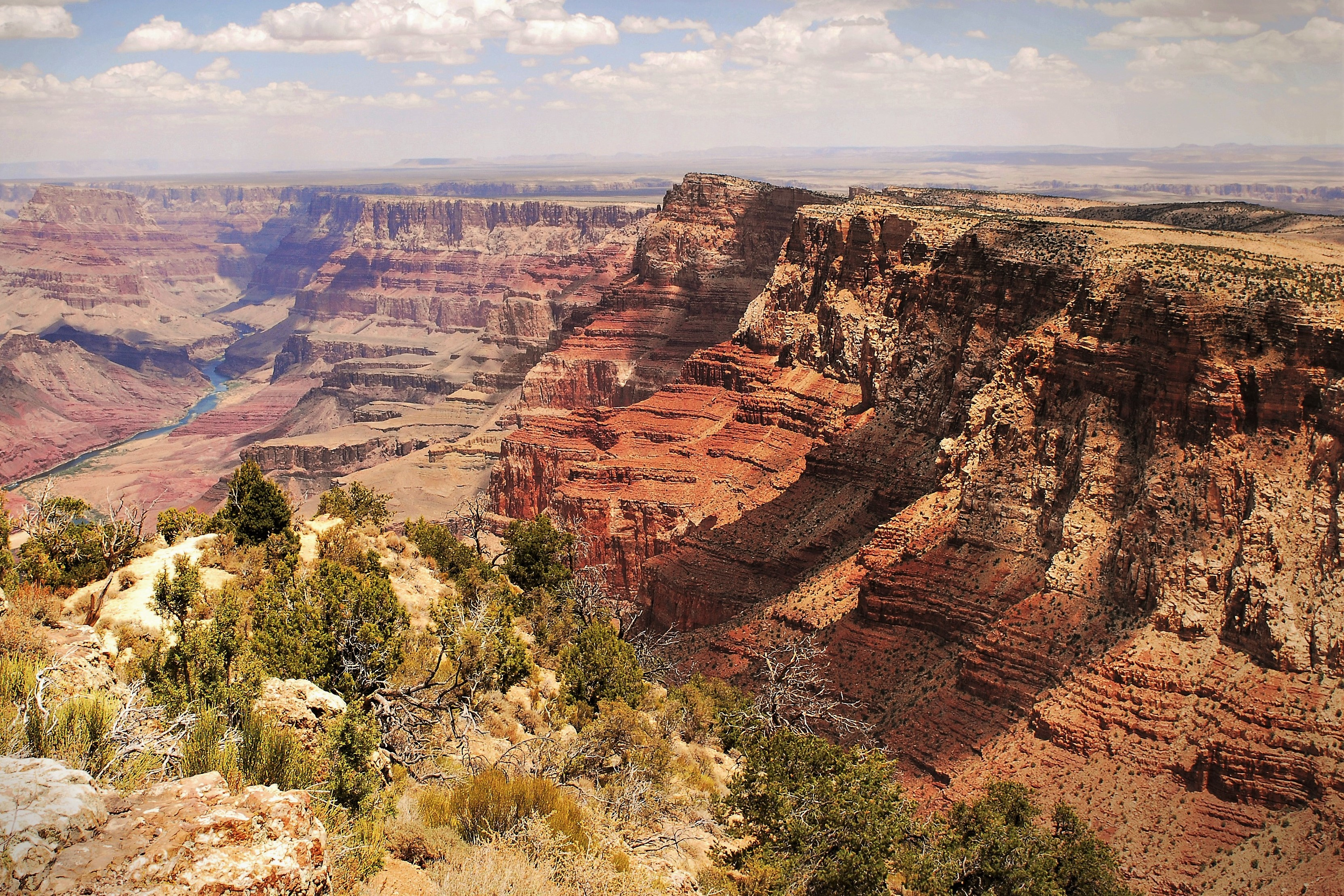
From Desert View

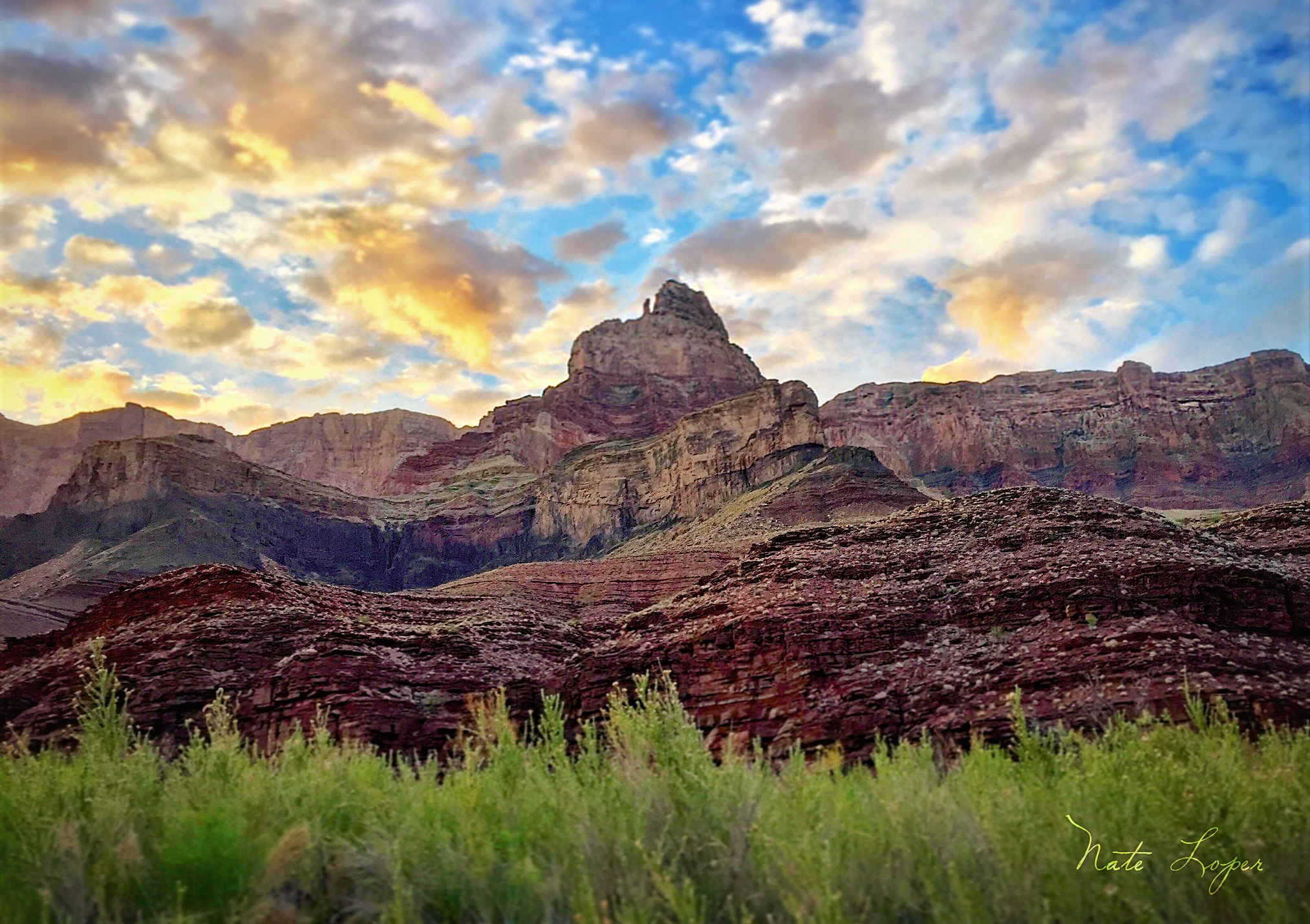
West aspect at sunrise

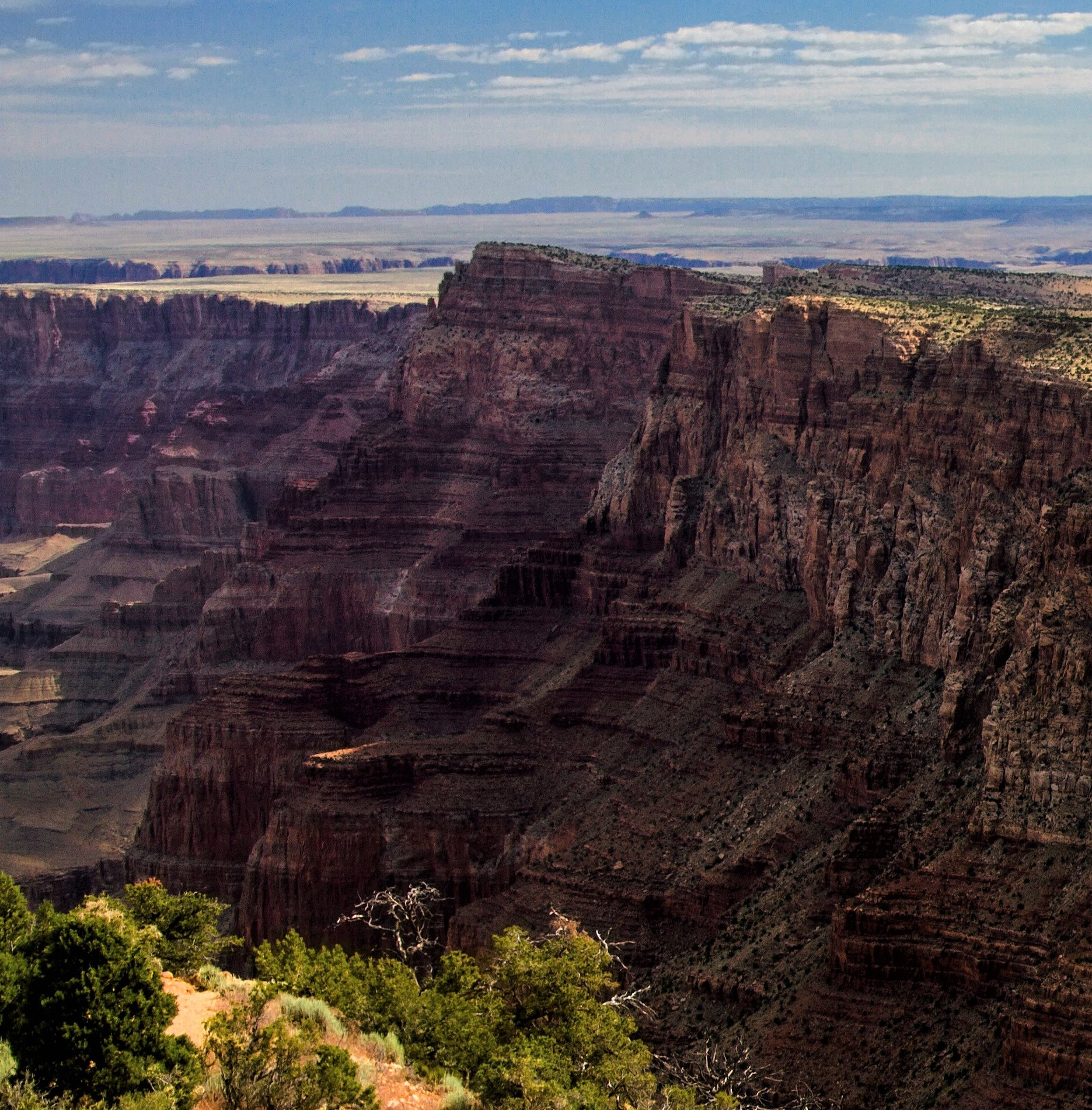
From Desert View

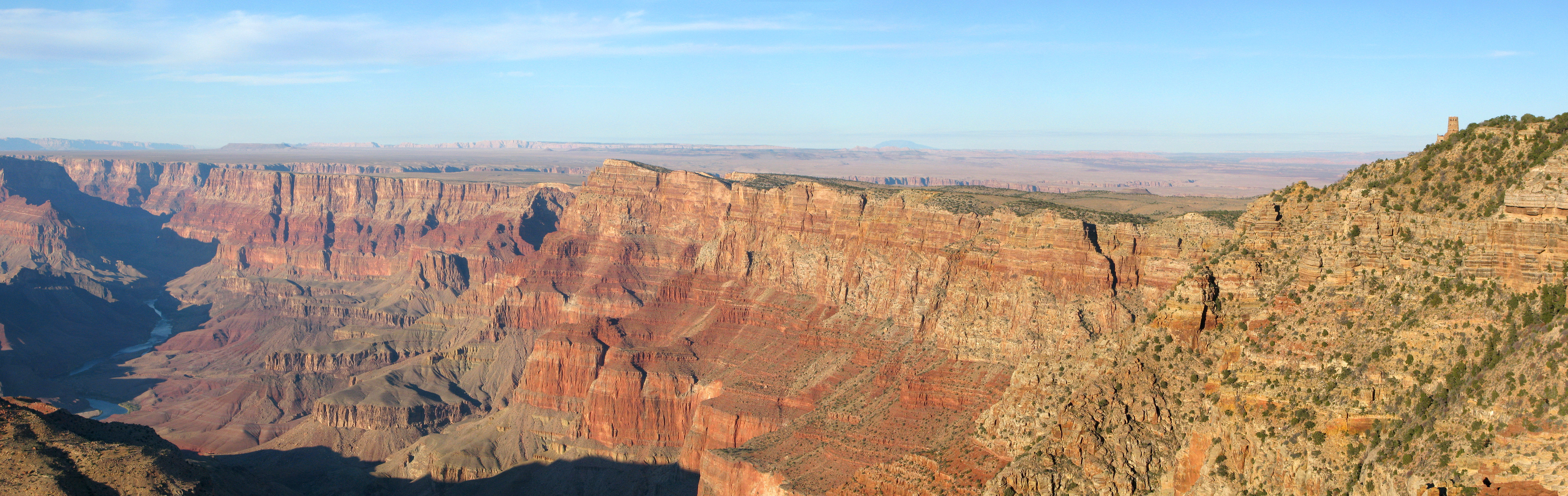
Comanche Point centered, as seen from Navajo Point. Desert View Watchtower upper right.

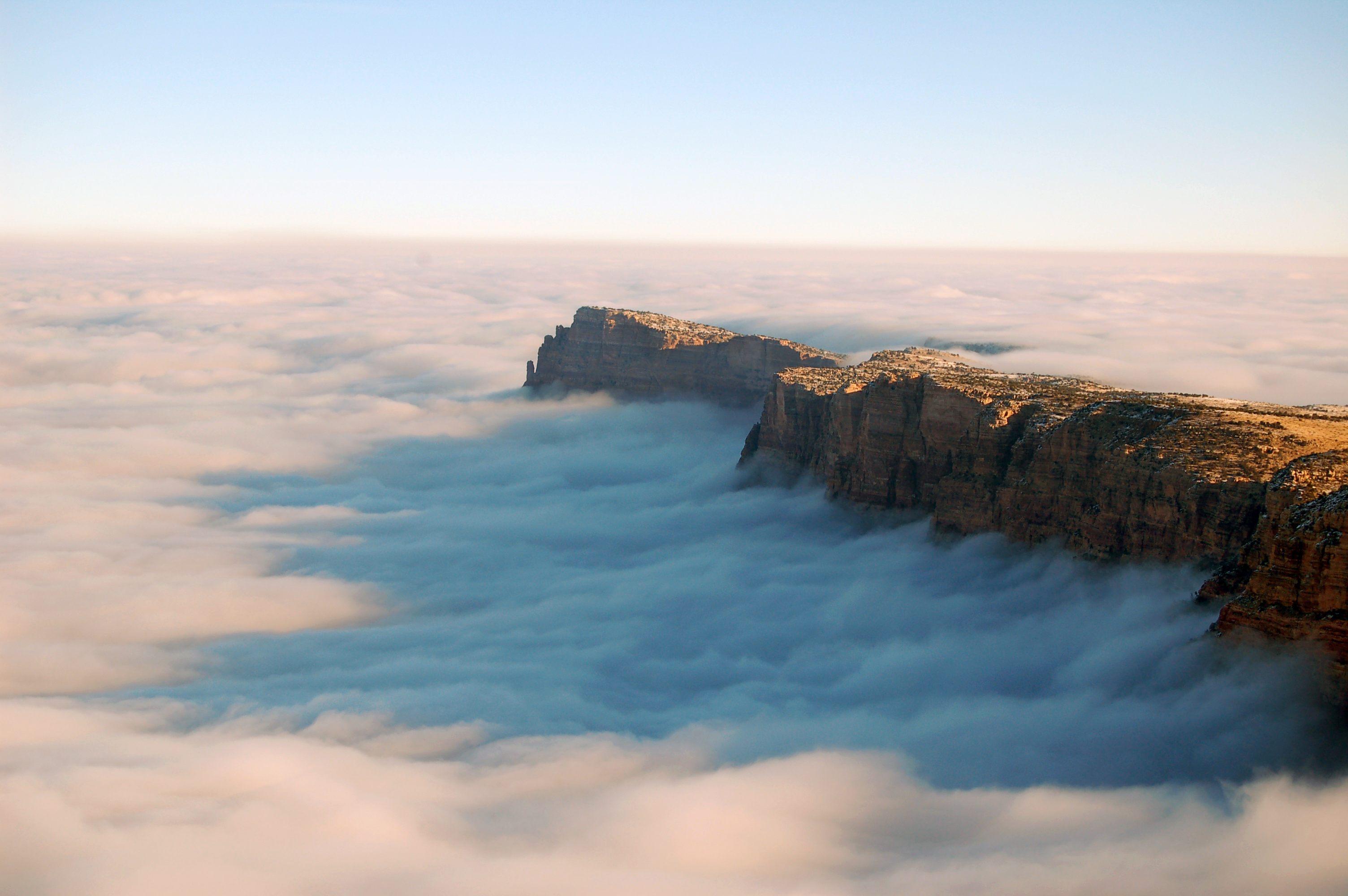
Comanche Point centered, as seen from Desert View during a rare total inversion

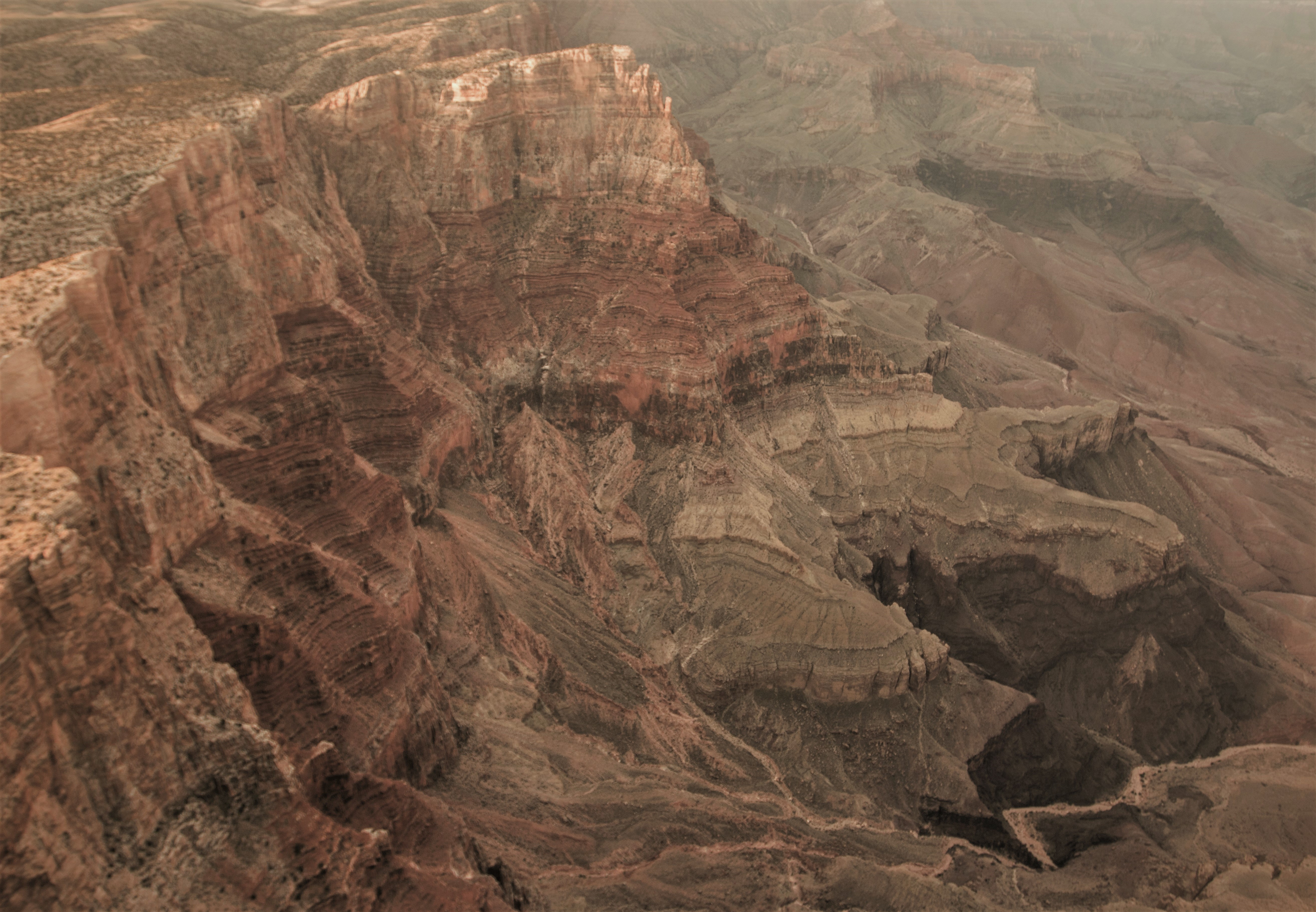
Aerial view of north aspect

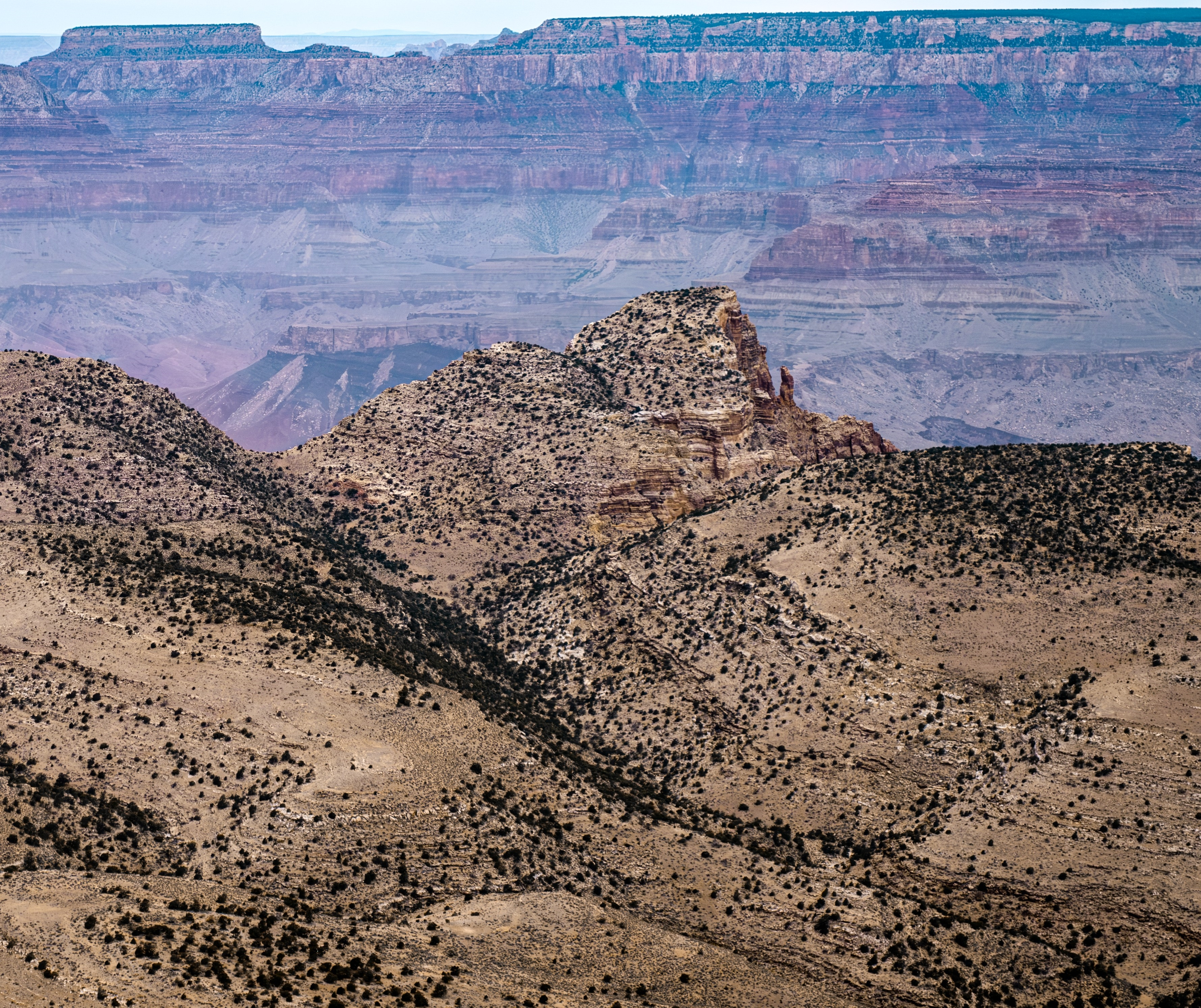
Aerial view of the east aspect of Comanche Point, centered

== See also ==
- Geology of the Grand Canyon area
