= Myles Keogh =

Irish-American military officer (1840–1876)

Myles Walter Keogh
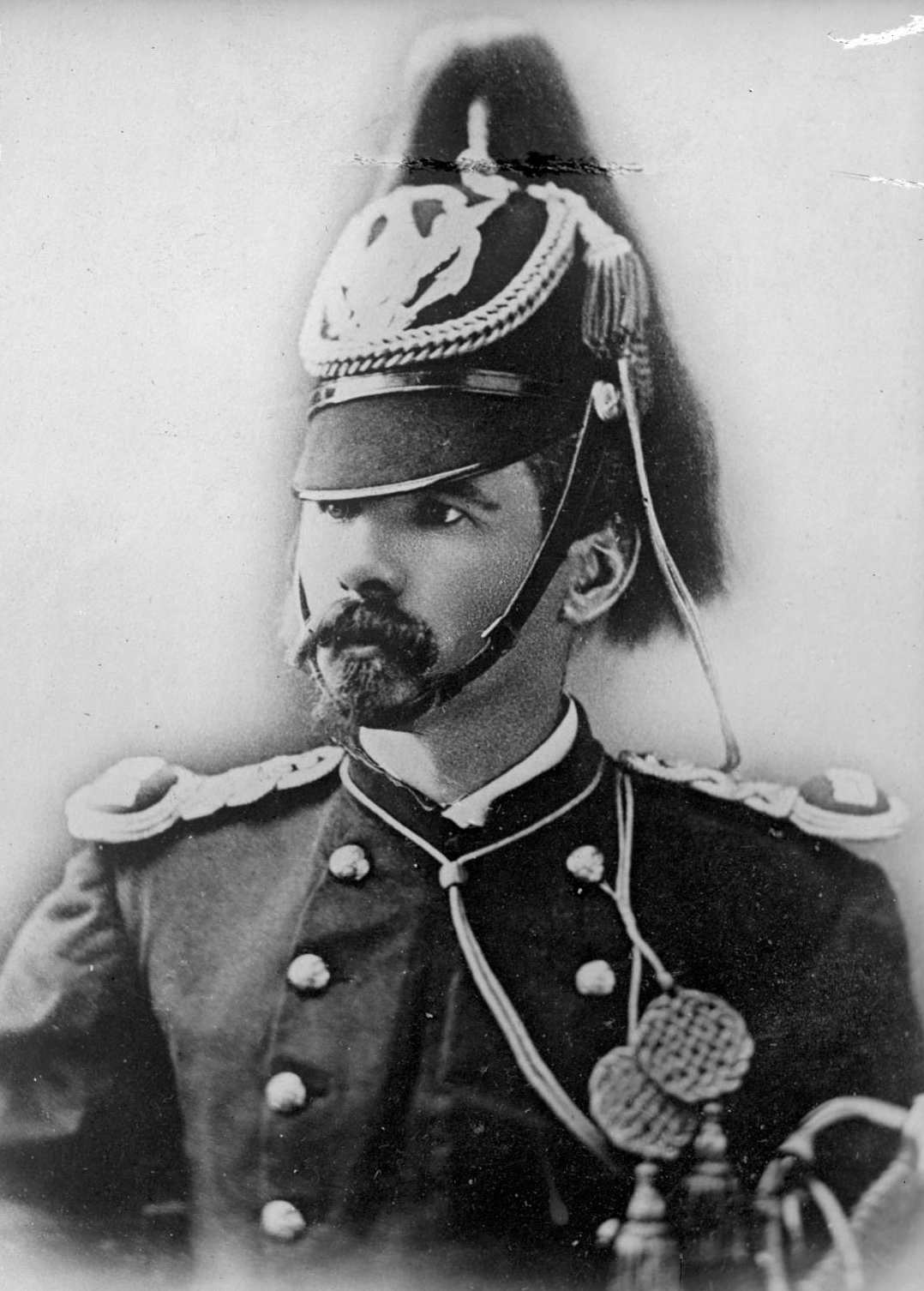
- Keogh c. 1875, by David Francis Barry
- Born: 25 March 1840; Leighlinbridge, County Carlow, Ireland, United Kingdom
- Died: 25 June 1876 (aged 36); Little Bighorn River, Montana, US
- Burial place: Fort Hill Cemetery, Auburn, New York
- Military career
- Allegiance: Papal States; United States
- Branch: Papal Army; United States Army
- Service years: 1860–1862 (Papal States); 1862–1876 (USA)
- Rank: Second lieutenant (Papal States); Brevet Lieutenant Colonel (Union Army); Captain (Regular Army)
- Unit: Cavalry Corps, Army of the Potomac
- Commands: Company I, 7th U.S. Cavalry
- Conflicts: Expedition of the Thousand; Battle of Castelfidardo; American Civil War; Battle of Port Republic; Second Battle of Bull Run; Battle of Antietam; Stoneman's 1863 Raid; Gettysburg campaign; Battle of Brandy Station; Battle of Upperville; Battle of Gettysburg; Battle of Funkstown; Battle of Williamsport; Bristoe Campaign; Atlanta campaign; Battle of Dallas; Battle of Kennesaw Mountain; Battle of Sunshine Church (POW); Indian Wars; Battle of the Little Bighorn †
- Awards: Pro Petri Sede Medal; Knight's Cross of the Order of St. Gregory the Great

Myles Walter Keogh (25 March 1840 – 25 June 1876) was an Irish soldier. He served in the armies of the Papal States during the war for Italian unification in 1860, and was recruited into the Union Army during the American Civil War, serving as a cavalry officer, particularly under Brig. Gen. John Buford during the Gettysburg campaign and the three-day Battle of Gettysburg. After the war, Keogh remained in the regular United States Army as commander of I Troop of the 7th Cavalry Regiment under George Armstrong Custer during the Indian Wars, until he was killed along with Custer and all five of the companies directly under Custer's command at the Battle of the Little Bighorn in 1876.

== Career ==
Myles Keogh was born in Orchard House, Leighlinbridge, County Carlow, on 25 March 1840. The farming carried out at Keogh's home place in Leighlinbridge was arable, barley being the main crop. This meant that the Keogh family were largely unaffected by the hunger and poverty that accompanied the Great Famine and ravaged the country between 1845 and 1850 – Keogh's childhood days. However, two, or possibly three, of Keogh's siblings did die young, apparently from typhoid – a disease associated with the famine and an illness that Myles also suffered as a boy.

He attended the National School in Leighlinbridge where he was enrolled under the spelling 'Miles Kehoe'. – "At Classics" was recorded as the reason for leaving in 1852. He was long thought to have attended St. Patrick's College, Carlow, but that college has not found any proof of his attendance. It is possible that he attended St. Mary's Knockbeg College where, from 1847, young lay pupils from St. Patrick's were sent to be educated.

By 1860, a twenty-year-old Myles Keogh had volunteered, along with over one thousand of his countrymen, to rally to the defence of Pope Pius IX following a call to arms by the Catholic clergy in Ireland during the unification of Italy. By August 1860, Keogh was appointed second lieutenant of his unit in the Battalion of St. Patrick, Papal Army under the command of General Christophe Léon Louis Juchault de Lamoricière. He was posted at Ancona, a central port city of Italy. The Papal forces were defeated in September in the Battle of Castelfidardo, and Ancona was surrounded. The soldiers surrendered and Keogh was imprisoned at Genoa. After his quick release by exchange, Keogh went to Rome and was invited to wear the spirited green uniforms of the Company of St. Patrick as a member of the Vatican Guard. During his service, the Holy See awarded him the Medaglia for gallantry, the Pro Petri Sede Medal, and the Cross of a Knight of the Order of St. Gregory the Great.

During the American Civil War, Secretary of State William H. Seward sought experienced European officers to serve the Union, and called upon a number of prominent clerics to assist in his endeavour. John Hughes, Archbishop of New York, travelled to Italy to recruit veterans of the Papal War, and met with Keogh and his comrades. In March 1862 Keogh resigned his commission in the Company of Saint Patrick, returned briefly to Ireland, and boarded the steamer Kangaroo in Liverpool. Keogh arrived in New York on 2 April.

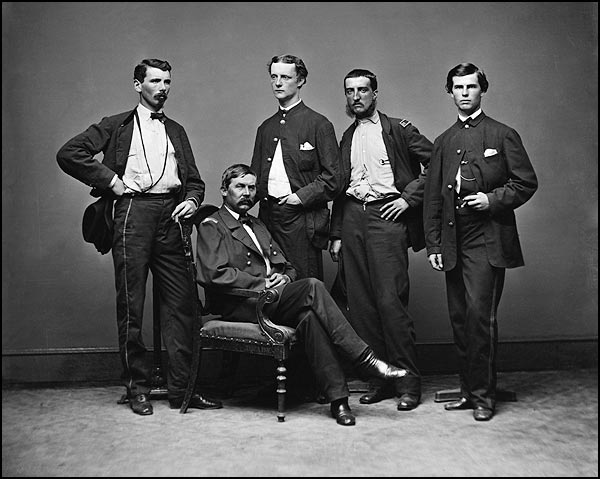
August 1863 – General Buford (seated) and staff, Keogh (left)

Through Secretary Seward's intervention, Keogh and two fellow soldiers from the Papal Army were given Captains' rank and assigned to the staff of Irish-born Brigadier General James Shields. Shields's forces confronted Stonewall Jackson's army in the Shenandoah Valley at the Battle of Port Republic. George B. McClellan, the commander of the Potomac Army, was impressed with Keogh, describing the young Captain as "a most gentlemanlike man, of soldierly appearance," whose "record had been remarkable for the short time he had been in the army." On McClellan's request, Keogh was temporarily transferred to his personal staff. He was to be with 'Little Mac' for only a few months but served the General during the Battle of Antietam. After McClellan's removal from command in November 1862, Keogh was reassigned to General John Buford's staff.

Keogh saw action during the Stoneman Raid in April 1863 and the Brandy Station on 9 June, which was practically all cavalry. Buford's 1st Division of cavalry fought with distinction in June 1863 as they skirmished with Confederate forces led by J.E.B. Stuart in Loudoun County, Virginia – most notably at Upperville. Keogh served under Buford at the strategically important Battle of Gettysburg in July 1863. Keogh received his first brevet for "gallant and meritorious services" during the battle and was promoted to the rank of major. After the battle, Buford "was taken ill from fatique and extreme hardship." Keogh nursed Buford until his death from typhoid in December 1863.

1865 – Major Myles Keogh, Union Army, standing, Robert Morrow seated

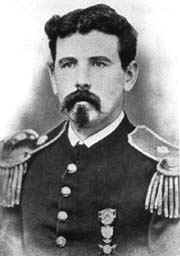
Myles Keogh

Major Keogh was now appointed as aide de camp to General George Stoneman. In July 1864, Stoneman raided to the south and southeast, destroying railroads and industrial works. The raids behind Confederate lines were also designed to free federal prisoners held at Macon, Georgia, and the nearly 30,000 captives at Andersonville prison.

On 31 July 1864, Keogh and Stoneman's command were surrounded during the Battle of Sunshine Church, Georgia. They were captured after their horses were shot out from under them. Keogh was held for two and a half months as a prisoner of war before being released through Union general William Tecumseh Sherman's efforts. Keogh would later receive a second brevet with promotion to lieutenant colonel for his gallantry with Stoneman at the Battle of Dallas.

At the war's end, brevet Lt. Colonel Keogh chose to remain on active duty and accepted a Regular Army commission as a second lieutenant in the 4th Cavalry on 4 May 1866. On 28 July 1866 he was promoted to Captain, and reassigned to the 7th Cavalry at Ft. Riley in Northeast Kansas where he took command of Company I. The 7th Cavalry Regiment was first commanded by Colonel Andrew Smith (from 1866 to 1869) and subsequently by Colonel Samuel D. Sturgis (from 1869 to 1886). George Armstrong Custer was the regiment's Lieutenant Colonel and its deputy commander.

== Postwar career ==
Officers of the 7th Cavalry – Myles W. Keogh, seated front

Keogh was generally well liked by fellow officers although the isolation of military duty on the western frontier often weighed heavily upon him. When depressed he occasionally drank to excess. Keogh himself noted: "Impudence and presumption carry with them great weight and a certain lack of sensitiveness is necessary to be successful. This lack of sensitiveness I unfortunately do not inherit."

From late 1866 to the summer of 1867, Keogh was responsible for defending the Smoky Hill route against Indian raids. When Sheridan took over from Hancock in 1868, he turned to Keogh for first-hand information on conditions on the front line. While with Sully's expedition, Keogh frequently saw combat. On one occasion, his horse Comanche, was wounded.

In the summer of 1874, Keogh was on leave to visit his homeland on a seven-month leave of absence, while Custer was leading a controversial expedition through the Black Hills. During this second visit home he deeded his inherited Clifden estate in Kilkenny to his sister Margaret..

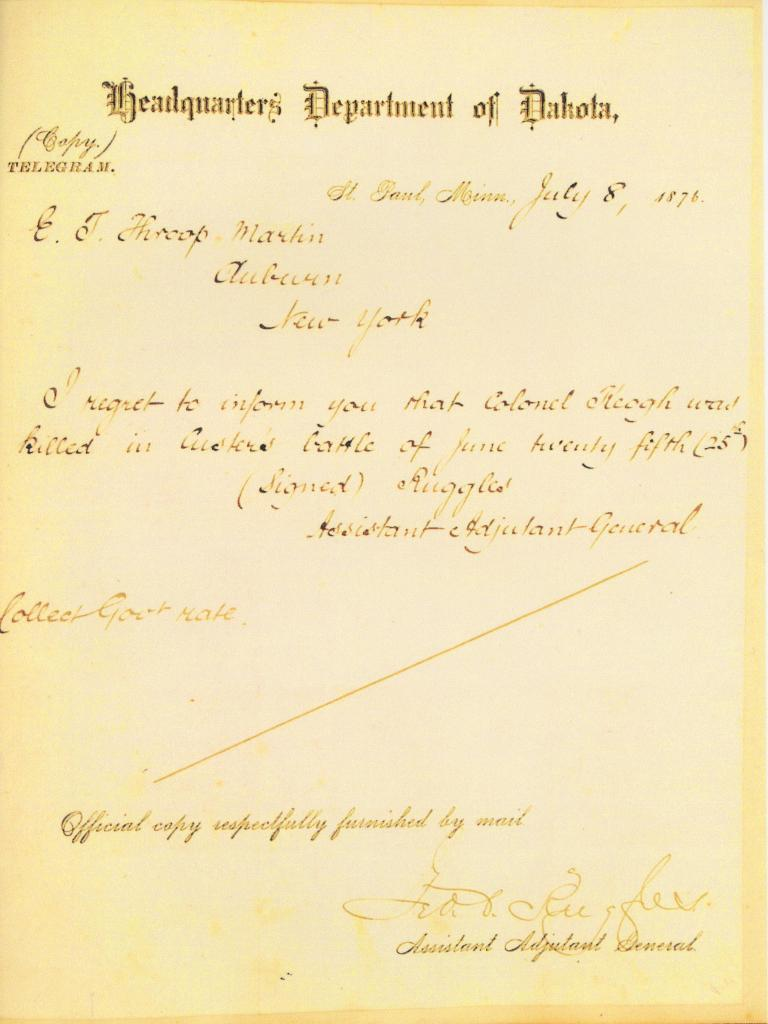
Telegram informing of the death of Myles Keogh

In October, Keogh returned to Fort Abraham Lincoln. As a precaution, he purchased a $10,000 life insurance policy and wrote a letter of warning to his close friends in the Throop-Martin family, Auburn, New York, outlining his burial wishes. He gave out copies of his will to fellow soldiers and left behind personal papers with instructions that they be burned if he was killed.

Keogh died in the Battle of the Little Bighorn on 25 June 1876. He carried a photograph of Capt. Thomas McDougall's sister, Josephine Buel, into battle. Days after the battle, Keogh's body was found at the center of a group of troopers that included his two sergeants, company trumpeter and guidon bearer. The slain officer was stripped but not mutilated, perhaps because of the "medicine" the Indians saw in the Agnus Dei ("Lamb of God") he wore on a chain about his neck or because many of Sitting Bull's warriors were Catholic. Keogh's left knee had been shattered by a bullet that corresponded to a wound through the chest and flank of his horse, indicating that horse and rider may have fallen together prior to the last rally.

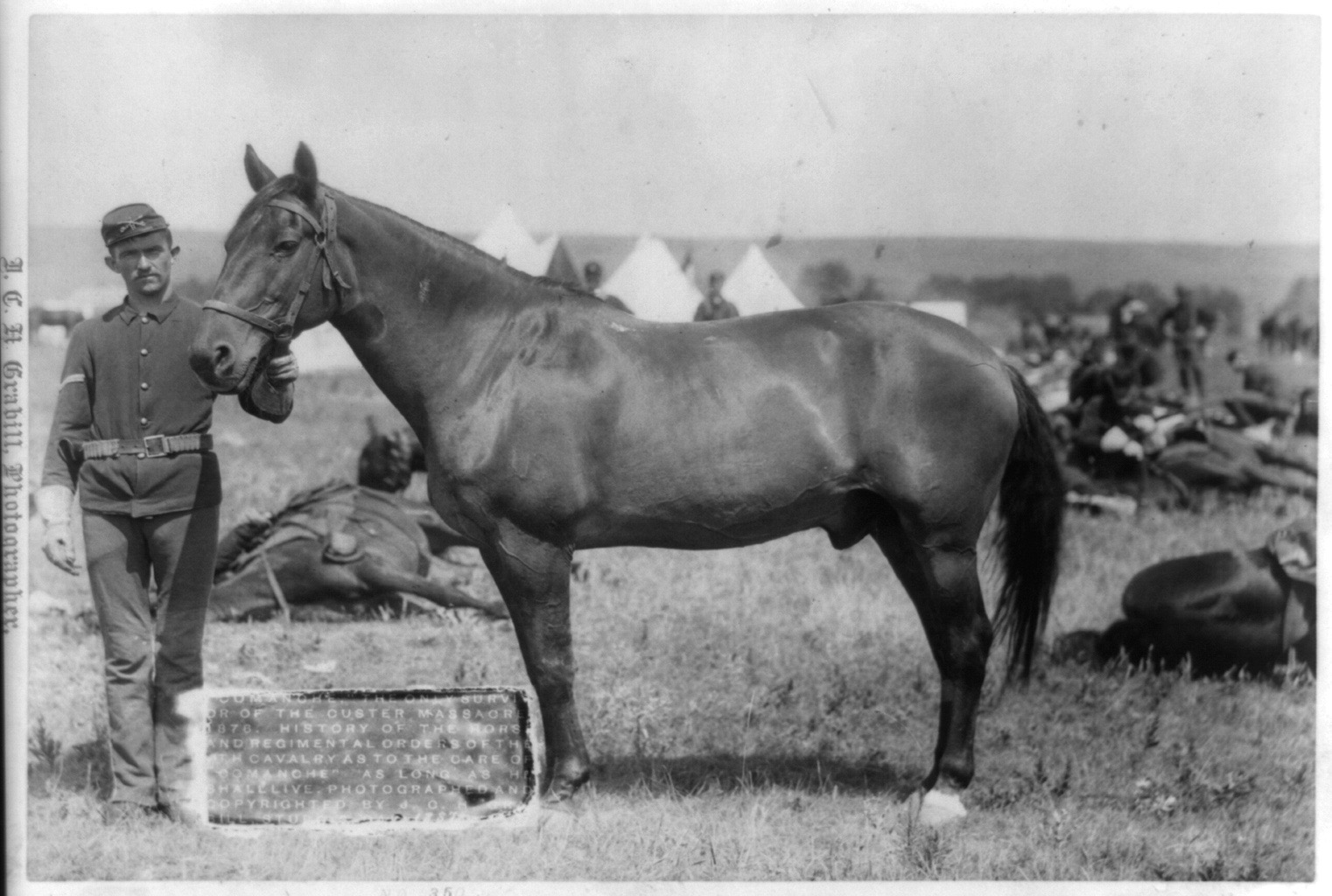
Keogh's horse Comanche

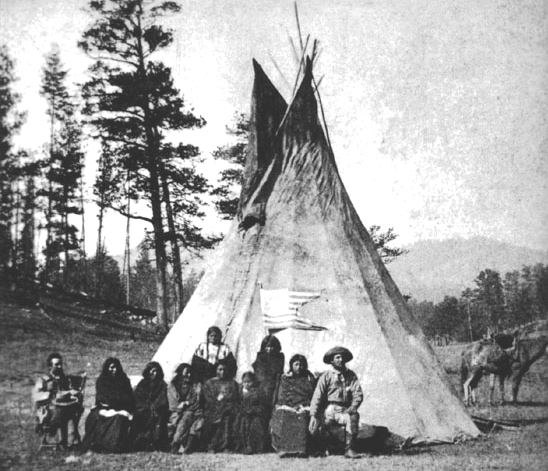
7th Cavalry Regiment Troop "I" guidon recovered at the camp of American Horse the Elder

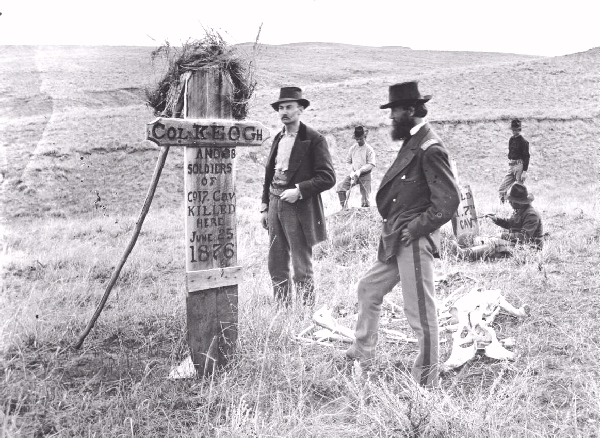
Keogh Battlefield Marker 1879

The badly injured animal was found on the battlefield, nursed back to health, and received a military funeral with full honors after his death in 1891. This horse, Comanche, is considered the only U.S. military survivor of the battle, though several other badly wounded horses were found and destroyed at the scene.

Keogh's bloody gauntlet and the guidon of his Company I were recovered by the army three months after Little Bighorn at the Battle of Slim Buttes. Originally buried on the battlefield, Keogh's remains were disinterred and taken to Auburn, as he had requested in his will. He was buried at Fort Hill Cemetery on 26 October 1877, an occasion marked by citywide official mourning and a military procession to the cemetery.

Tongue River Cantonment, in southeastern Montana, was renamed Fort Keogh in his honour. The fort was first commanded by Nelson A. Miles. The 55,000-acre fort is today an agricultural experiment station. Miles City, Montana is located two miles from the old fort.

== U.S. military career and ranks ==
Appointed Captain, US Volunteers, 9 April 1862

Promoted Major, US Volunteers, 7 April 1864

Brevetted Lieutenant Colonel, US Volunteers, 13 March 1865

Honorably discharged from US Volunteers, 1 September 1866

Appointed Second Lieutenant, Regular Army, 4 May 1866

Promoted Captain, Regular Army, 28 July 1866

Killed in action, 25 June 1876.
