= Comanche (horse) =

War horse of the U.S Army

Comanche was a mixed breed horse who survived the battle of the Little Bighorn. This battle fought during the Great Sioux War of 1876 is largely remembered as Custer's Last Stand in which his company of 7th Cavalry Soldiers were killed by Northern Cheyenne and their Lakota allies. This battle took place on June 25th, 1876, in what is now the State of Montana.

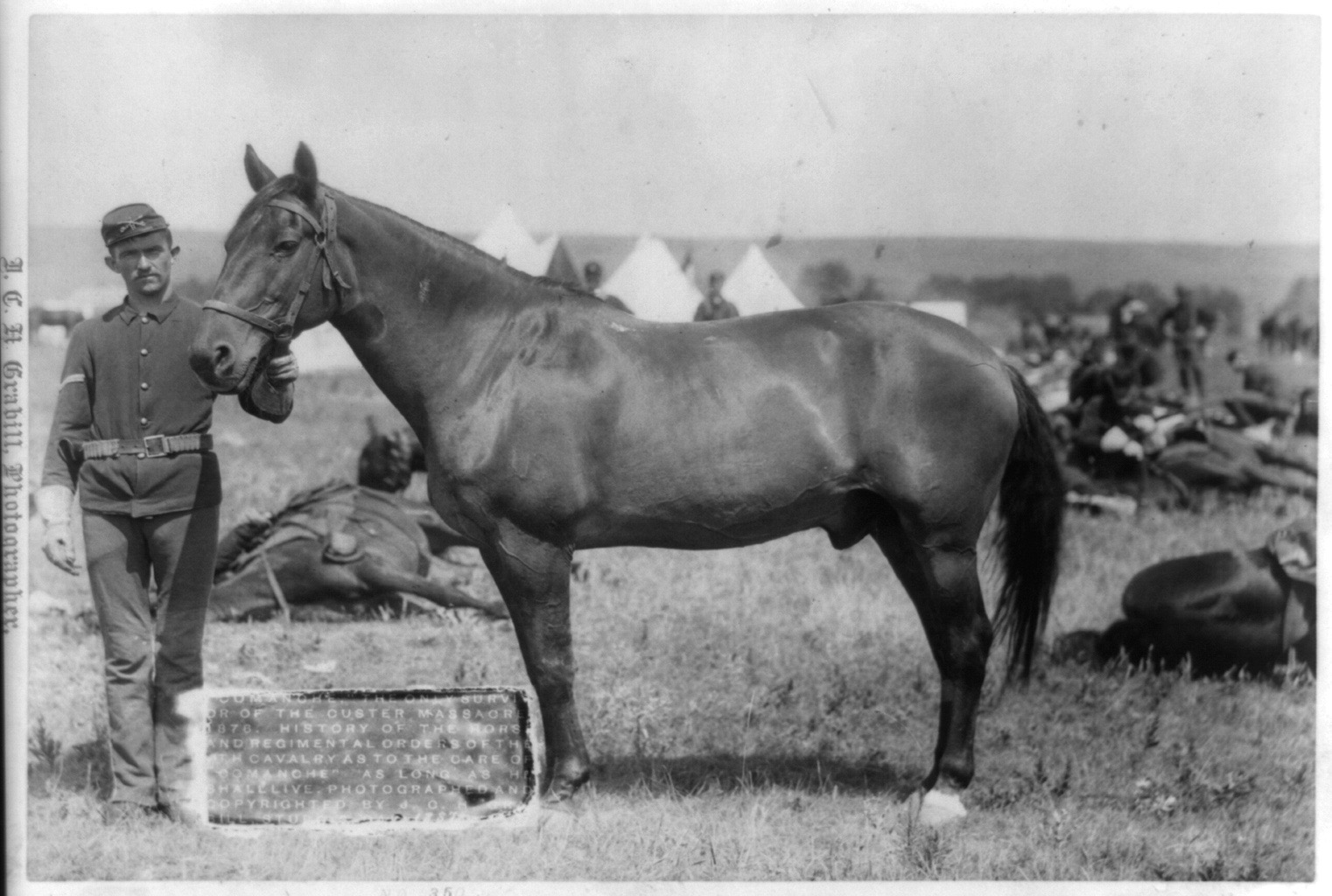
Comanche in 1887 photographed by John C. H. Grabill

== Biography ==
The horse was bought by the U.S. Army in 1868 in St. Louis, Missouri and sent to Fort Leavenworth, Kansas. His ancestry and date of birth were both uncertain. Captain Myles Keogh of the 7th Cavalry liked the 15 hands (60 inches, 152 cm) gelding and bought him for his personal mount, to be ridden only in battle. He has alternatively been described as bay or bay dun. In 1868, while the army was fighting the Comanche in Kansas, the horse was wounded in the hindquarters by an arrow but continued to carry Keogh in the fight. He named the horse “Comanche” to honor his bravery. Comanche was wounded many more times but always exhibited the same toughness.

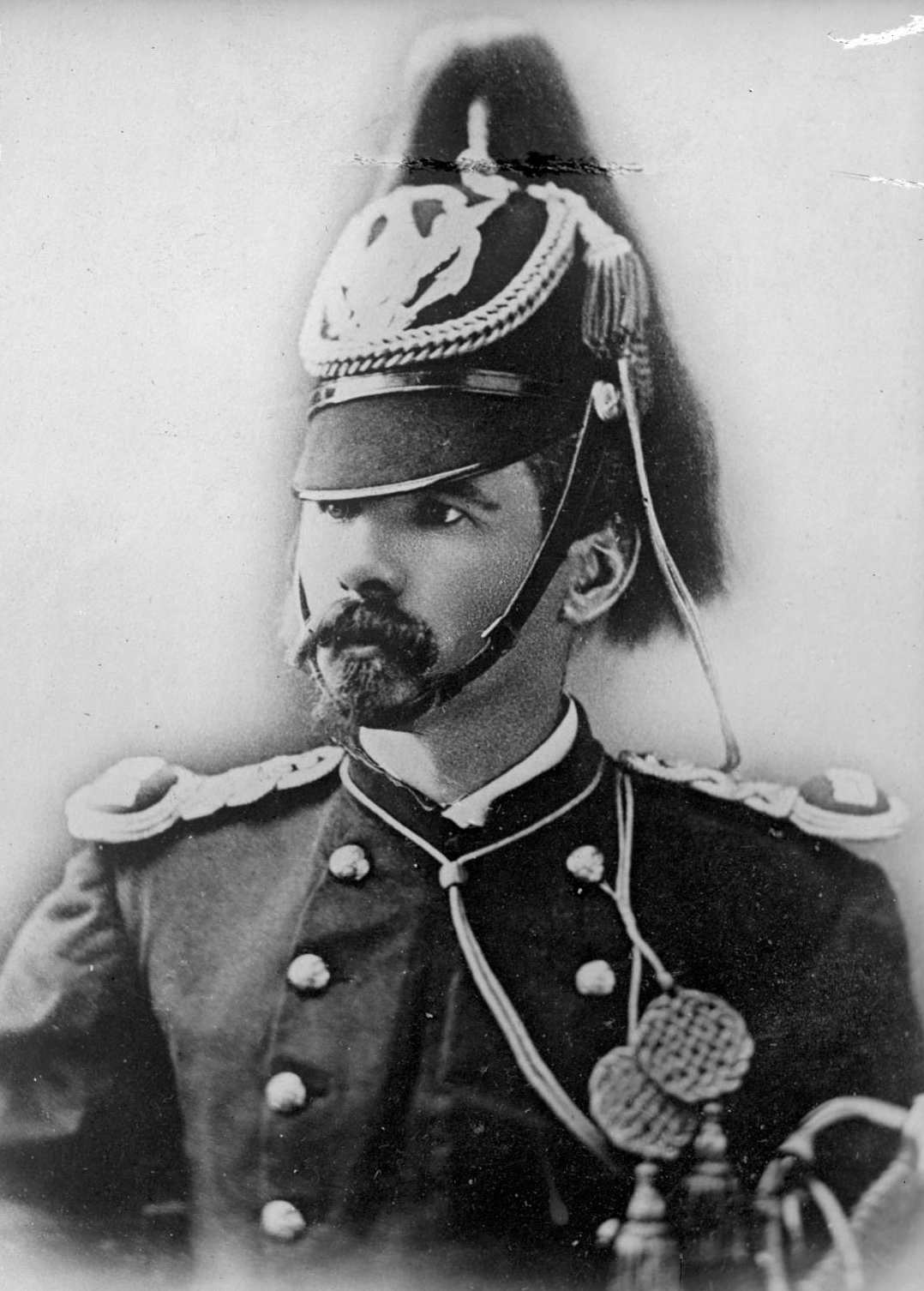
Myles Keogh 1872

On June 25, 1876, Captain Keogh rode Comanche at the Battle of the Little Bighorn, led by Lt. Col. George Armstrong Custer. The battle was notable as their entire detachment was killed. US soldiers found Comanche, badly wounded, two days after the battle. After being transported to Fort Lincoln, he was slowly nursed back to health. After a lengthy convalescence, Comanche was retired. In April 1878, Colonel Samuel D. Sturgis issued the following order:

Headquarters Seventh United States Cavalry, Fort A. Lincoln, D. T., April 10th, 1878. General Orders No. 7.

(1.) The horse known as 'Comanche,' being the only living representative of the bloody tragedy of the Little Big Horn, June 25th, 1876, his kind treatment and comfort shall be a matter of special pride and solicitude on the part of every member of the Seventh Cavalry to the end that his life be preserved to the utmost limit. Wounded and scarred as he is, his very existence speaks in terms more eloquent than words, of the desperate struggle against overwhelming numbers of the hopeless conflict and the heroic manner in which all went down on that fatal day.

(2.) The commanding officer of Company I will see that a special and comfortable stable is fitted up for him, and he will not be ridden by any person whatsoever, under any circumstances, nor will he be put to any kind of work.

(3.) Hereafter, upon all occasions of ceremony of mounted regimental formation, 'Comanche,' saddled, bridled, and draped in mourning, and led by a mounted trooper of Company I, will be paraded with the regiment.

By command of Col. Sturgis, E. A. Garlington, First Lieutenant and Adjutant, Seventh Cavalry."

The ceremonial order inspired a reporter for the Bismarck Tribune to go to Fort Abraham Lincoln to interview Comanche. He "asked the usual questions which his subject acknowledged with a toss of his head, a stamp of his foot and a flourish of his beautiful tail."

His official keeper, the farrier John Rivers of Company I, Keogh's old troop, saved "Comanche's reputation" by answering more fully. Here is the gist of what the reporter learned (Bismarck Tribune, May 10, 1878):

Comanche was a veteran, 21 years old, and had been with the 7th Cavalry since its Organization in '66.... He was found by Sergeant [Milton J.] DeLacey [Co. I] in a ravine where he had crawled, there to die and feed the Crows. He was raised up and tenderly cared for. His wounds were serious, but not necessarily fatal if properly looked after...He carries seven scars from as many bullet wounds. There are four back of the foreshoulder, one through a hoof, and one on either hind leg. On the Custer battlefield (actually Fort Abraham Lincoln) three of the balls were extracted from his body and the last one was not taken out until April 1877…Comanche is not a great horse, physically talking; he is of medium size, neatly put up, but quite noble looking. He is very gentle. His color is 'claybank' He would make a handsome carriage horse...

In June 1879, Comanche was brought to Fort Meade by the Seventh Regiment, where he was kept like a prince until 1887, when he was taken to Fort Riley, Kansas. As an honor, he was made "Second Commanding Officer" of the 7th Cavalry. At Fort Riley, he became something of a pet, occasionally leading parades and indulging in a fondness for beer.

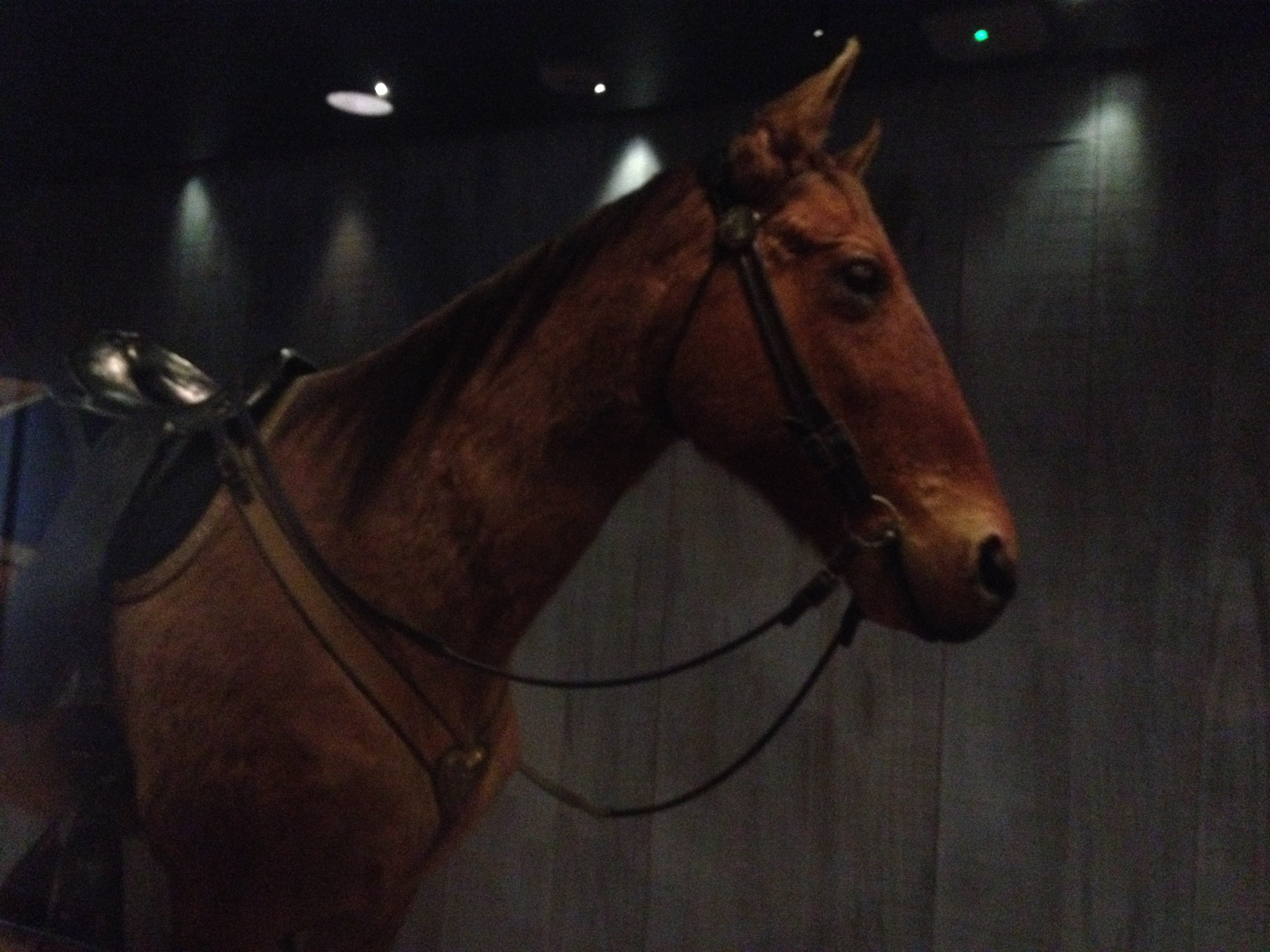
Comanche at the University of Kansas Natural History Museum

Comanche died of colic on November 7, 1891, believed to be 29 years old at the time. He is one of only four horses in United States history to be given a military funeral with full military honors, the others were Black Jack, Sergeant Reckless and Chief. His remains were not buried but instead were sent to the University of Kansas and preserved, where the taxidermy mount can still be seen today in the university's Natural History Museum. Comanche was restored by museum conservator Terry Brown in 2005.

Comanche is often described as the sole survivor of Custer's detachment, but like so many other legends surrounding the Little Bighorn battle, this one is not entirely accurate. Other horses survived, but, in better condition after the battle, were taken as spoils of battle. As historian Evan S. Connell writes in Son of the Morning Star:

Comanche was reputed to be the only survivor of the Little Bighorn, but quite a few Seventh Cavalry mounts survived, probably more than one hundred, and there was even a yellow bulldog. Comanche lived on another fifteen years, and when he died, he was stuffed and to this day remains in a glass case at the University of Kansas. So, protected from moths and souvenir hunters by his humidity-controlled glass case, Comanche stands patiently, enduring generation after generation of undergraduate jokes. The other horses are gone, and the mysterious yellow bulldog is gone, which means that in a sense the legend is true. Comanche alone survived.

== In popular culture ==
=== Literature ===
- Appel, David (1951). Comanche: Story of America's Most Heroic Horse. World Publishing Company. ASIN B0007HG0SW.

=== Movies ===
- Tonka (1958), also released as A Horse Named Comanche, a Walt Disney film starring Sal Mineo, based on David Appel's book
- Comanche (2000), a film written and directed by Burt Kennedy, starring Kris Kristofferson and Wilford Brimley

=== Video Game ===
- Live A Live (1994), a JRPG with multiple chapters based on different time periods. In The Wild West one, after defeating O.Dio - he's revealed to be a horse, the sole survivor from 7th Cavalry Regiment, possessed by the dead and given a human form.

=== Music ===
- "Comanche (The Brave Horse)" (1961), a song by Johnny Horton
- ”Equine Elvis” (2023), a song by Rachel Baiman

== See also ==
- Horses in warfare
- Military animal
- List of historical horses
