= Joe Louis (horse) =

Joe Louis was a horse owned by the United States Army. He was purchased by the Army in 1938 and named in honor of boxer Joe Louis. Joe Louis died at Fort Riley, Kansas in 1957 and was the last of three living operational cavalry mounts of the U.S. Army, the others being Chief and Gambler.

== See also ==
- United States Cavalry
