= Comanche Territory =

Comanche Territory may refer to:

- Comanche Territory (1950 film), a 1950 American Western
- Comanche Territory (1997 film), a 1997 Spanish drama set in Bosnia
- Comanchería, the Spanish name for the territory controlled by the Comanche people during the late 18th and early 19th centuries
