= Bud Lewis (golfer) =

American golfer (1908–2011)

Joseph "Bud" Lewis (August 30, 1908 – November 22, 2011) was an American professional golfer.

Lewis became a member of the PGA in May 1931, and became the first member in PGA history to reach 80 years of membership. Lewis won two major golf tournaments, the Philadelphia Open Championship in 1942 and 1950. Lewis qualified for the PGA Championship four times, and the U.S. Open three times. Starting in 1943, Lewis served as the Pro at Manufacturer's Golf & Country Club for 37 years. He was inducted into the Philadelphia section of the PGA Hall of Fame in 1996. He died in Wyncote, Pennsylvania of natural causes on November 22, 2011. His wife Regina had predeceased him. He was survived by two sons, a daughter, 12 grandchildren and 18 great-grandchildren. At the time of his death he was the oldest living member of the Professional Golfers' Association of America (PGA).
