= Montana High School Association =

American high school athletic governing body

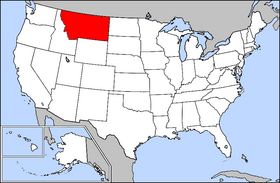
- Abbreviation: MHSA
- Formation: 1921
- Type: Volunteer; NPO
- Legal status: 501(c)(3)
- Headquarters: 631 N Last Chance Gulch; Helena, MT 59601
- Region served: Montana
- Members: 182 schools
- Executive Director: Brian Michelotti
- Affiliations: National Federation of State High School Associations
- Staff: 8
- Website: mhsa.org
- Remarks: (406) 442-6010

The Montana High School Association (MHSA) is the governing body of high school athletics in the U.S. state of Montana. It was founded in 1921. In 2025 there were 182 member high schools.

== Classifications ==
The MHSA divides schools based upon their total enrollment for all activities. As of 2023, the enrollment criteria for each class is: 801 and up for Class AA, 301-800 for Class A, 101-300 for Class B and 1-100 for Class C. Further divisions may occur geographically, which varies depending on the activity. However, tournaments to crown state champions solely use class divisions.

=== AA Divisions ===
Western AA

- Big Sky High School - Missoula
- Butte High School - Butte
- Capital High School - Helena
- Flathead High School - Kalispell
- Glacier High School - Kalispell
- Helena High School - Helena
- Hellgate High School - Missoula
- Sentinel High School - Missoula

Eastern AA

- Belgrade High School - Belgrade
- Billings Senior High School - Billings
- Billings West High School - Billings
- Bozeman High School - Bozeman
- Charles M. Russell High School - Great Falls
- Gallatin High School - Bozeman
- Great Falls High School - Great Falls
- Skyview High School - Billings

=== A Divisions ===
Northwestern A

- Browning High School - Browning
- Bigfork High School - Bigfork
- Columbia Falls High School - Columbia Falls
- Libby High School - Libby
- Polson High School - Polson
- Ronan High School - Ronan
- Whitefish High School - Whitefish

Southwestern A

- Beaverhead County High School - Dillon
- Butte Central Catholic High School - Butte
- Corvallis High School - Corvallis
- Frenchtown High School - Frenchtown
- Hamilton High School - Hamilton
- Stevensville High School - Stevensville

Northeastern A

- Custer County High School - Miles City
- Dawson High School - Glendive
- Fergus County High School - Lewistown
- Havre High School - Havre
- Sidney High School - Sidney

Southeastern A

- Billings Central Catholic High School - Billings
- East Helena High School - East Helena
- Hardin High School - Hardin
- Laurel High School - Laurel
- Lockwood High School - Lockwood
- Park High School - Livingston

== Sanctioned activities ==
The MHSA oversees all of the following activities of its constituent schools.

Fall Sports

- Cross Country
- Football
- Golf - Class AA and A
- Soccer
- Volleyball

Winter Sports

- Basketball
- Swimming
- Wrestling

Spring Sports

- Baseball
- Golf - Class B and C
- Softball
- Tennis
- Track & Field

Athletic Events

- Spirit Squad

Non-Athletic Events

- Choir
- Orchestra
- School band
- Speech, Drama, and Debate

Emerging sports

- Girls flag football

== Baseball MHSA State Champions ==
Year	AA	A-B
2026	Missoula Sentinel	Bigfork
2025	Billings Central Catholic	
2024	Florence-Carlton	
2023	Polson	

== Basketball MHSA State Champions ==
=== Boys ===
Year	AA	A	B	C
2026	Missoula Sentinel (4)	Billings Central Catholic (4)	Lodge Grass (8)	Scobey (6)
2025	Billings Skyview (3)	Beaverhead County (Dillon) (12)	Loyola Sacred Heart (Missoula) (3)	Box Elder (5)
2024	Gallatin (Bozeman)	Beaverhead County (Dillon) (11)	Loyola Sacred Heart (Missoula) (2)	Box Elder (4)
2023	Missoula Hellgate (14)	Fergus (Lewistown) (2)	Loyola Sacred Heart (Missoula)	Manhattan Christian (4)
2022	Helena Capital (3)	Butte Central Catholic (7)	Three Forks (3)	Manhattan Christian (3)
2021	Billings Skyview (2)	Billings Central Catholic (3)	Lodge Grass (7)	Scobey (5)
2020	Billings Skyview (2) & Missoula Hellgate (13)^{†}	Butte Central Catholic (6) & Hardin (6)^{†}	Fairfield (10) & Lodge Grass (6)^{†}	Fairview (2) & Scobey (4)^{†}
2019	Bozeman (10)	Billings Central Catholic (2)	Bigfork (3)	Manhattan Christian (2)
2018	C.M. Russell (Great Falls) (8)	Hardin (5)	Bigfork (2)	Arlee (2)
2017	Glacier (Kalispell)	Beaverhead County (Dillon) (10)	Malta (8)	Arlee
2016	Billings Skyview (2)	Beaverhead County (Dillon) (9)	Choteau (3)	Box Elder (3)
2015	Billings Skyview	Laurel (4)	Choteau (2)	Belt (3)
2014	Helena Capital (2)	Columbia Falls (5)	Bigfork	Box Elder (2)
2013	Missoula Hellgate (12)	Stevensville	Malta (7)	Winifred/Roy (3)
2012	Billings West (8)	Beaverhead County (Dillon) (8)	Malta (6)	Fairview
2011	Bozeman (9)	Columbia Falls (4)	Wolf Point (8)	Scobey/Opheim (3)
2010	C.M. Russell (Great Falls) (7)	Laurel (3)	Rocky Boy	Big Sandy (2)
2009	C.M. Russell (Great Falls) (6)	Beaverhead County (Dillon) (7)	Fairfield (9)	Twin Bridges
2008	Billings West (7)	Browning (4)	Shelby (2)	Winifred (3)
2007	Billings West (6)	Beaverhead County (Dillon) (6)	Huntley Project (Worden) (2)	Hays-Lodgepole (2)
2006	Great Falls (10)	Columbia Falls (3)	Cut Bank (8)	Melstone
2005	Missoula Hellgate (11)	Columbia Falls (2)	Cut Bank (7)	Gardiner (2)
2004	C.M. Russell (Great Falls) (5)	Libby (2)	Fairfield (8)	Brockton
2003	Bozeman (8)	Columbia Falls	Cut Bank (6)	Roberts
2002	C.M. Russell (Great Falls) (4)	Browning (3)	Harlem	Hays-Lodgepole
2001	C.M. Russell (Great Falls) (3)	Browning (2)	Three Forks (2)	Heart Butte (2)
2000	C.M. Russell (Great Falls) (2)	Colstrip	Baker (2)	Heart Butte
1999	Bozeman (7)	Beaverhead County (Dillon) (5)	Huntley Project (Worden)	Kremlin-Gildford
1998	Bozeman (6)	Polson (2)	Malta (5)	Kremlin-Gildford
1997	Missoula Big Sky	Hardin (4)	Fairfield (7)	Cascade
1996	Billings Senior (9)	Billings Central Catholic	Malta (4)	Scobey (2)
1995	Great Falls (9)	Hardin (3)	Fairfield (6)	Belt (2)
1994	Great Falls (8)	Havre (2)	Fairfield (5)	Reed Point
1993	Missoula Hellgate (10)	Polson	Cut Bank (5)	Highwood
1992	Bozeman (5)	Butte Central Catholic (5)	Fairfield (4)	Chester (2)
1991	Helena (10)	Whitefish (2)	Fairfield (3)	Chester
1990	Missoula Hellgate (9)	Beaverhead County (Dillon) (4)	Lodge Grass (5)	Box Elder
1989	Flathead (Kalispell) (5)	Park (Livingston) (6)	Lodge Grass (4)	Gardiner
1988	Bozeman (4)	Custer County (Miles City) (8)	Lodge Grass (3)	Hinsdale
1987	Billings Senior (8)	Dawson County (Glendive) (5)	Plains	Plenty Coups (3)
1986	Missoula Sentinel (3)	Dawson County (Glendive) (4)	Chinook (3)	Absarokee (2)
1985	Missoula Hellgate (8)	Park (Livingston) (5)	Malta (3)	Absarokee
1984	Butte (10)	Butte Central Catholic (4)	Jefferson (Boulder)	Manhattan Christian
1983	Helena Capital	Park (Livingston) (4)	Conrad (2)	Plenty Coups (2)
1982	Flathead (Kalispell) (4)	Dawson County (Glendive) (3)	Lodge Grass (2)	Bridger
1981	Billings West (5)	Dawson County (Glendive) (2)	Frenchtown	Plenty Coups
1980	Billings West (4)	Browning	Lodge Grass	Outlook
1979	Bozeman (3)	Fergus (Lewistown)	Scobey	Flaxville
1978	Bozeman (2)	Butte Central Catholic (3)	Plentywood (2)	Outlook
1977	C.M. Russell (Great Falls)	Dawson County (Glendive)	St. Labre Indian Catholic (Ashland) (2)	Columbus (2)
1976	Great Falls (7)	Plentywood	Belt	Flaxville
1975	Billings West (3)	Poplar (5)	Medicine Lake	Westby (2)
1974	Billings West (2)	Poplar (4)	Three Forks	Winifred
1973	Missoula Sentinel (2)	Custer County (Miles City) (7)	Manhattan (2)	Power
1972	Missoula Sentinel	Laurel (2)	Malta (2)	Westby
1971	Helena (9)	Sidney (6)	Malta	Busby
1970	Flathead (Kalispell) (3)	Whitefish	Baker	Park City
1969		Laurel	Choteau	Bozeman Rosary
1968		Wolf Point (7)	Chinook (2)	Seeley-Swan
1967		Billings Senior (7)	Conrad	St. Labre Indian Catholic (Ashland)
1966		Libby	Cut Bank (4)	Edgar
1965		Great Falls (6)	Circle	Miles City Sacred Heart
1964		Missoula Hellgate (7)	Harlowton	Manhattan
1963	Billings West	Park (Livingston) (3)	Big Sandy	Superior (2)
1962	Great Falls (5)	Sidney (5)	Wolf Point (6)	Corvallis
1961	Missoula Hellgate (6)	Custer County (Miles City) (6)	Wolf Point (5)	Bozeman Rosary
1960	Billings (6)	Sidney (4)	Ronan	Gildford
1959	Missoula Hellgate (5)	Sidney (3)	Fairfield (2)	Superior
1958	Butte (9)	Sidney (2)	Red Lodge	Belgrade (2)
1957	Butte (8)	Sidney	Cut Bank (3)	Drummond
1956	Great Falls (4) & Butte Central Catholic (2)^{†}	Custer County (Miles City) (5)	St. Ignatius	Belgrade
1955		Helena (8)	Shelby	Stanford
1954		Helena (7)	Fairfield	Belfry (3)
1953		Helena (6)	Wolf Point (4)	Belfry (2)
1952		Flathead (Kalispell) (2)	Wolf Point (3)	Belfry
1951		Flathead (Kalispell)	Anaconda Central	Poplar (3)
1950		Butte Central Catholic	Fort Benton	Nashua
1949		Missoula Hellgate (4)	Hardin (2)	
1948		Anaconda (3)	Hardin	
1947		Missoula Hellgate (3)	Hamilton	
1946		Missoula Hellgate (2)	Beaverhead County (Dillon) (3)	
1945		Helena (5)	Columbus	
1944		Great Falls (3)	Wolf Point (2)	
1943	Cancelled due to World War II.			
1942		Billings (5)	Klein	
1941		Butte (7)	Wolf Point	
1940		Havre	Sweet Grass County (Big Timber) (2)	
1939		Park (Livingston) (2)	Bearcreek	
1938		Great Falls (2)	Cut Bank (2)	
1937		Park (Livingston)	Cut Bank	
1936		Great Falls	Beaverhead County (Dillon) (2)	
1935		Custer County (Miles City) (4)	Poplar (2)	
1934		Anaconda (2)	Poplar	
1933		Park (Livinston)	Butte (6)	
1932		Butte (5)		
1931		Custer County (Miles City) (3)		
1930		Chinook		
1929		Custer County (Miles City) (2)		
1928		Butte (4)		
1927		Billings (4)		
1926		Billings (3)		
1925		Butte (3)		
1924		Butte (2)		
1923		Custer County (Miles City)		
1922		Missoula Hellgate		
1921		Billings (2)		
1920		Beaverhead County (Dillon)		
1919		Helena (4)		
1918		Bozeman		
1917		Butte		
1916		Helena (3)		
1915		Helena (2)		
1914		Helena		
1913		Sweet Grass County (Big Timber)		
1912		Anaconda		
1911		Billings		

^{†} Co-Champions

=== Girls ===
Year	AA	A	B	C
2026	Gallatin (Bozeman) (2)	Havre (10)	Baker (5)	Denton/Geyser/Stanford/Geraldine (2)
2025	Gallatin (Bozeman)	Billings Central Catholic (9)	Huntley Project (Worden)	Saco/Whitewater/Hinsdale (4)
2024	Billings Skyview (2)	Billings Central Catholic (8)	Baker (4)	Saco/Whitewater/Hinsdale (3)
2023	Billings West (6)	Havre (9)	Bigfork	Saco/Whitewater/Hinsdale (2)
2022	Billings Skyview	Havre (8)	Colstrip (3)	Winifred/Roy (5)
2021	Helena Capital (3)	Havre (7)	Sweet Grass County (Big Timber) (3)	Fort Benton
2020	Billings West (5) & Helena Capital (2)^{†}	Billings Central Catholic (7) & Hardin (2)^{†}	Forsyth & Loyola Sacred Heart (Missoula) (2)^{†}	Belt (7) & Winifred/Roy (4)^{†}
2019	Helena (7)	Havre (6)	Wolf Point (3)	Box Elder (3)
2018	Helena (6)	Havre (5)	Three Forks (3)	Box Elder (2)
2017	Helena (5)	Columbia Falls (2)	Fairfield (8)	Belt (6)
2016	Bozeman (9)	Butte Central Catholic (3)	Malta (10)	Belt (5)
2015	Helena Capital	Hamilton (2)	Malta (9)	Gardiner
2014	Missoula Sentinel (6)	Havre (4)	Fairfield (7)	Belt (4)
2013	Missoula Sentinel (5)	Laurel (2)	Fairfield (6)	Belt (3)
2012	Missoula Sentinel (4)	Billings Central Catholic (6)	Fairfield (5)	Belt (2)
2011	Billings West (4)	Butte Central Catholic (2)	Fairfield (4)	Saco/Whitewater
2010	Bozeman (8)	Billings Central Catholic (5)	Malta (8)	Fairview (2)
2009	Missoula Big Sky (4)	Anaconda (3)	Fairfield (3)	Highwood (2)
2008	Missoula Big Sky (3)	Anaconda (2)	Fairfield (2)	Highwood
2007	Bozeman (7)	Custer County (Miles City) (5)	Malta (7)	Circle
2006	Bozeman (6)	Laurel	Loyola Sacred Heart (Missoula)	Reed Point/Rapelje (2)
2005	Billings West (3)	Fergus (Lewistown) (4)	Broadwater (Townsend) (2)	Reed Point/Rapelje
2004	Billings West (2)	Fergus (Lewistown) (3)	Broadwater (Townsend)	Harlowton (2)
2003	Billings West	Beaverhead County (Dillon) (3)	Wolf Point (2)	Charlo
2002	No girls basketball champions were crowned in the 2002 calendar year as the season switched from fall (2001-02) to winter (2002-03). This coincided with girls volleyball switching seasons from winter to fall.			
2001	Flathead (Kalispell) (2)	Fergus (Lewistown) (2)	Baker (3)	Chester
2000	Flathead (Kalispell)	Custer County (Miles City) (4)	Malta (6)	Richey (2)
1999	Bozeman (5)	Colstrip (2)	Malta (5)	Richey
1998	Bozeman (4)	Custer County (Miles City) (3)	Florence-Carlton	Box Elder
1997	Helena (4)	Havre (3)	Malta (4)	Big Sandy (2)
1996	Bozeman (3)	Browning	Baker (2)	Winifred (3)
1995	Bozeman (2)	Beaverhead County (Dillon) (2)	Malta (3)	Winifred (2)
1994	Missoula Hellgate (2)	Hardin	Malta (2)	Kremlin-Gildford
1993	Missoula Sentinel (3)	Colstrip	Troy (2)	Winifred
1992	Bozeman	Ronan	Troy	Drummond
1991	Helena (3)	Beaverhead County (Dillon)	Malta	Belt
1990	Helena (2)	Billings Central Catholic (4)	Simms (2)	Ennis
1989	Missoula Hellgate	Custer County (Miles City) (2)	Baker	Manhattan Christian (3)
1988	Missoula Big Sky (2)	Custer County (Miles City)	Fairfield	Geraldine
1987	Missoula Big Sky	Billings Central Catholic (3)	Wolf Point	Ryegate
1986	C.M. Russell (Great Falls) (3)	Billings Central Catholic (2)	Chinook (2)	Big Sandy
1985	Missoula Sentinel (2)	Billings Central Catholic	Chinook	Fromberg
1984	Helena	Hamilton	Fairview	Opheim (3)
1983	Columbia Falls	Dawson County (Glendive) (3)	Whitehall	Opheim (2)
1982	Great Falls (4)	Butte Central Catholic	Simms	Opheim
1981	Great Falls (3)	Glasgow (2)	Sweet Grass County (Big Timber) (2)	Manhattan Christian (2)
1980	Great Falls (2)	Glasgow	Sweet Grass County (Big Timber)	Willow Creek
1979	Missoula Sentinel	Fergus (Lewistown)	Three Forks (2)	Arlee
1978	Havre (2)	Whitefish	Three Forks	Moore
1977	C.M. Russell (Great Falls) (2)	Dawson County (Glendive) (2)	Harlowton	Manhattan Christian
1976		Havre	Outlook	
1975		C.M. Russell (Great Falls)	Outlook	
1974		Great Falls	Granite (Philipsburg)	
1973		Anaconda		
1972		Dawson County (Glendive)		

^{†} Co-Champions

== Cross Country MHSA State Champions ==
=== Boys ===
Year	AA	A	B	C
2026	Bozeman (18)	Hardin (8)	Poplar (4)	Drummond
2025	Bozeman (17)	Hardin (7)	Harlem	Cascade (2)
2024	Bozeman (16)	Hardin (6)	Manhattan (8)	Cascade
2023	Great Falls (3)	Browning (23)	Jefferson (Boulder) (11)	Manhattan Christian (10)
2022	Bozeman (15)	Park (Livingston)	St. Ignatius	Manhattan Christian (9)
2021	Missoula Hellgate (3)	Hamilton (5)	Bigfork (3)	Manhattan Christian (8)
2020	Missoula Sentinel (3)	Hamilton (4)	Lincoln County (Eureka) (2)	Manhattan Christian (7)
2019	Bozeman (14)	Columbia Falls (3)	Lincoln County (Eureka)	Manhattan Christian (6)
2018	Bozeman (13)	Columbia Falls (2)	Manhattan (7)	Manhattan Christian (5)
2017	Bozeman (12)	Corvallis (4)	Manhattan (6)	Manhattan Christian (4)
2016	Bozeman (11)	Frenchtown/Alberton	Broadwater (Townsend)	Manhattan Christian (3)
2015	Bozeman (10)	Corvallis (3)	Manhattan (5)	Richey/Lambert
2014	Bozeman (9)	Hamilton (3)	Red Lodge (3)	Culbertson (4)
2013	Bozeman (8)	Hamilton/Victor (2)	Red Lodge (2)	Plenty Coups (6)
2012	Bozeman (7)	Whitefish	Red Lodge	Culbertson/Bainville (3)
2011	Bozeman (6)	Corvallis (2)	Manhattan (4)	Culbertson/Bainville (2)
2010	Bozeman (5)	Corvallis	Loyola Sacred Heart (Missoula) (8)	Joliet (3)
2009	Bozeman (4)	Columbia Falls	Manhattan (3)	Culbertson
2008	Bozeman (3)	Hamilton	Darby	Joliet (2)
2007	Missoula Hellgate (2)	Browning (22)	Thompson Falls	Winnett
2006	Bozeman (2)	Dillon	Loyola Sacred Heart (Missoula) (7)	Gardiner (2)
2005	Flathead (Kalispell) (11)	Ronan	Manhattan (2)	Plenty Coups (5)
2004	Flathead (Kalispell) (10)	Browning (21)	Loyola Sacred Heart (Missoula) (6)	Heart Butte (4)
2003	Helena (3)	Browning (20)	Loyola Sacred Heart (Missoula) (5)	Heart Butte (3)
2002	Flathead (Kalispell) (9)	Browning (19)	Loyola Sacred Heart (Missoula) (4)	Dodson/Whitewater
2001	Flathead (Kalispell) (8)	Billings Central Catholic	Loyola Sacred Heart (Missoula) (3)	Plenty Coups (4)
2000	Flathead (Kalispell) (7)	Browning (18)	Loyola Sacred Heart (Missoula) (2)	Plenty Coups (3)
1999	Flathead (Kalispell) (6)	Polson (4)	Loyola Sacred Heart (Missoula)	Kremlin-Gildford
1998	Flathead (Kalispell) (5)	Polson (3)	Poplar (3)	Kremlin-Gildford
1997	Flathead (Kalispell) (4)	Polson (2)	Poplar (2)	Kremlin-Gildford
1996	C.M. Russell (Great Falls) (4)	Polson	Poplar	Kremlin-Gildford
1995	C.M. Russell (Great Falls) (3)	Colstrip (3)	St. Labre Indian Catholic (Ashland) (3)	Valley Christian (Missoula)
1994	Flathead (Kalispell) (3)	Colstrip (2)	Lodge Grass	Joliet
1993	Billings Skyview (6)	Hardin (4)	Cut Bank (2)	Heart Butte (2)
1992	Billings Skyview (5)	Hardin (3)	Jefferson (Boulder) (10)	Manhattan Christian (2)
1991	C.M. Russell (Great Falls) (2)	Browning (17)	Jefferson (Boulder) (9)	Heart Butte
1990	Billings Skyview (4)	Browning (16)	Jefferson (Boulder) (8)	Manhattan Christian
1989	Billings Skyview (3)	Browning (15)	Jefferson (Boulder) (7)	Roberts
1988	Helena (2)	Hardin (2)	Jefferson (Boulder) (6)	Brockton (2)
1987	Billings Skyview (2)	Browning (14)	Jefferson (Boulder) (5)	Brockton
1986	Flathead (Kalispell) (2)	Colstrip	Browning (13)	Frazer
1985	Flathead (Kalispell)	Hardin	Billings Skyview	Rocky Boy
1984	Missoula Sentinel (2)	Dawson County (Glendive)	Browning (12)	Seeley-Swan (6)
1983	Bozeman	Browning (11)	Whitehall	Seeley-Swan (5)
1982	Helena	Browning (10)	Jefferson (Boulder) (4)	Seeley-Swan (4)
1981	Billings Senior (6)	Browning (9)	Jefferson (Boulder) (3)	Seeley-Swan (3)
1980	Helena Capital (4)	Butte Central Catholic (5)	Browning (8)	Plenty Coups (2)
1979	Great Falls (2)	Browning (7)	Jefferson (Boulder) (2)	Plenty Coups
1978	C.M. Russell (Great Falls)	Browning (6)	Jefferson (Boulder)	Busby
1977	Helena Capital (3)	Browning (5)	Plentywood	Gardiner
1976	Helena Capital (2)	Browning (4)	Manhattan	Lustre Christian (2)
1975	Great Falls	Browning (3)	Bigfork (2)	Box Elder
1974	Helena Capital	Browning (2)	Bigfork	Busby
1973	Billings West (2)	Butte Central Catholic (4)	Cascade	Shepherd (2)
1972	Missoula Hellgate	Butte Central Catholic (3)	Cut Bank	Shepherd
1971	Billings West	Butte Central Catholic (2)	Browning	Lustre Christian
1970	Missoula Sentinel	Anaconda (2)	Seeley-Swan (2)	Moore
1969	Billings Senior (5)	Anaconda	Seeley-Swan	Busby
1968	Billings Senior (4)	Butte Central Catholic	Shelby (2)	Busby
1967	Billings Senior (3)	Glasgow	Shelby	Busby
1966		Billings Senior (2)	Busby	
1965		Billings Senior	St. Labre Indian Catholic (Ashland) (2)	
1964		Butte	St. Labre Indian Catholic (Ashland)	

=== Girls ===
Year	AA	A	B	C
2026	Helena (2)	Polson (2)	Jefferson (Boulder) (11)	Cascade (6)
2025	Bozeman (17)	Hardin (9)	Jefferson (Boulder) (10)	Drummond
2024	Gallatin (Bozeman)	Hardin (8)	Manhattan (6)	Roberts (4)
2023	Missoula Hellgate (3)	Hardin (7)	Manhattan (5)	Roberts (3)
2022	Missoula Hellgate (2)	Hardin (6)	Columbus	Manhattan Christian (6)
2021	Bozeman (16)	Columbia Falls	Red Lodge	Manhattan Christian (5)
2020	Bozeman (15)	Laurel (2)	Broadwater (Townsend) (2)	Manhattan Christian (4)
2019	Bozeman (14)	Hardin (5)	Broadwater (Townsend)	Seeley-Swan (3)
2018	Missoula Hellgate	Hardin (4)	Manhattan (4)	West Yellowstone (3)
2017	Bozeman (13)	Hardin (3)	Manhattan (3)	West Yellowstone (2)
2016	Bozeman (12)	Hardin (2)	Manhattan (2)	Melstone/Winnett (4)
2015	Bozeman (11)	Corvallis (5)	Bigfork (5)	Melstone/Winnett (3)
2014	Bozeman (10)	Corvallis (4)	Manhattan	West Yellowstone
2013	Bozeman (9)	Corvallis (3)	Glasgow/Opheim (17)	Twin Bridges (2)
2012	Bozeman (8)	Corvallis (2)	Glasgow (16)	Twin Bridges
2011	Bozeman (7)	Corvallis	Glasgow (15)	Belt/Centerville (7)
2010	Bozeman (6)	Whitefish (4)	Glasgow (14)	Belt/Centerville (6)
2009	Bozeman (5)	Whitefish (3)	Colstrip (2)	Belt/Centerville (5)
2008	Bozeman (4)	Whitefish (2)	Glasgow (13)	Belt/Centerville (4)
2007	Bozeman (3)	Whitefish	Glasgow (12)	Belt/Centerville (3)
2006	Billings Senior (2)	Ronan (2)	Glasgow (11)	Belt/Centerville (2)
2005	Billings Senior	Ronan	Glasgow (10)	Lincoln (2)
2004	Flathead (Kalispell) (15)	Havre (3)	Loyola Sacred Heart (Missoula) (3)	Lincoln
2003	Flathead (Kalispell) (14)	Bigfork (4)	Loyola Sacred Heart (Missoula) (2)	Valier (5)
2002	Flathead (Kalispell) (13)	Bigfork (3)	Plains	Belt/Centerville
2001	Flathead (Kalispell) (12)	Bigfork (2)	Cut Bank (2)	Manhattan Christian (3)
2000	Great Falls (4)	Havre (2)	Jefferson (Boulder) (9)	Manhattan Christian (2)
1999	C.M. Russell (Great Falls) (8)	Fergus (Lewistown) (10)	Jefferson (Boulder) (8)	Manhattan Christian
1998	C.M. Russell (Great Falls) (7)	Fergus (Lewistown) (9)	Frenchtown (2)	Brockton/Culbertson (2)
1997	C.M. Russell (Great Falls) (6)	Custer County (Miles City)	Loyola Sacred Heart (Missoula)	Brockton/Culbertson
1996	Flathead (Kalispell) (11)	Fergus (Lewistown) (8)	Jefferson (Boulder) (7)	Roberts (2)
1995	C.M. Russell (Great Falls) (5)	Colstrip	Cut Bank	Cascade (5)
1994	Flathead (Kalispell) (10)	Polson	Lodge Grass (3)	Cascade (4)
1993	Flathead (Kalispell) (9)	Laurel	Glasgow (9)	Cascade (3)
1992	C.M. Russell (Great Falls) (4)	Browning (8)	Lodge Grass (2)	Roberts
1991	Flathead (Kalispell) (8)	Hardin	Lodge Grass	Valier (4)
1990	Helena Capital (2)	Havre	Jefferson (Boulder) (6)	Valier (3)
1989	Flathead (Kalispell) (7)	Hamilton (2)	Jefferson (Boulder) (5)	Valier (2)
1988	Flathead (Kalispell) (6)	Fergus (Lewistown) (7)	Valier	
1987	Flathead (Kalispell) (5)	Hamilton	Jefferson (Boulder) (4)	
1986	Flathead (Kalispell) (4)	Fergus (Lewistown) (6)	Browning (7)	Centerville (5)
1985	Great Falls (3)	Fergus (Lewistown) (5)	Browning (6)	Centerville (4)
1984	C.M. Russell (Great Falls) (3)	Fergus (Lewistown) (4)	Browning (5)	Centerville (3)
1983	Bozeman (2)	Fergus (Lewistown) (3)	Jefferson (Boulder) (3)	Centerville (2)
1982	Bozeman	Browning (4)	Jefferson (Boulder) (2)	Centerville
1981	Billings West (2)	Browning (3)	Jefferson (Boulder)	
1980	Flathead (Kalispell) (3)	Glasgow (8)	Browning (2)	
1979	Billings West	Glasgow (7)	Arlee	
1978	C.M. Russell (Great Falls) (2)	Glasgow (6)	Seeley-Swan (2)	
1977	Great Falls (2)	Glasgow (5)	Forsyth	Lustre Christian
1976	C.M. Russell (Great Falls)	Glasgow (4)	Cascade (2)	Melstone (2)
1975	Great Falls	Glasgow (3)	Bigfork	Frenchtown
1974	Helena Capital	Glasgow (2)	Cascade	Melstone
1973	Helena	Glasgow	Seeley-Swan	Froid (2)
1972	Flathead (Kalispell) (2)	Fergus (Lewistown) (2)	Browning	Froid
1971	Flathead (Kalispell)	Fergus (Lewistown)	Shelby	Hot Springs

== Football MHSA State Champions ==
Year	AA	A	B	C - 8 Man	C - 6 Man
2026	Glacier (Kalispell) (3)	East Helena	Manhattan (3)	Drummond/Granite (Philipsburg) (10)	Grass Range/Winnett
2025	Glacier (Kalispell) (2)	Frenchtown (6)	Manhattan (2)	Scobey (4)	Chester/Joplin/Inverness
2024	Helena Capital (13)	Billings Central Catholic (6)	Malta (4)	Fairview (3)	Box Elder
2023	Bozeman (7)	Beaverhead County (Dillon) (9)	Florence-Carlton (4)	Fairview (2)	Centerville
2022	Helena Capital (12)	Fergus (Lewistown) (2)	Florence-Carlton (3)	Belt (2)	Big Sandy
2021	Missoula Sentinel (3)	Hamilton (3)	Florence-Carlton (2)	Thompson Falls (3)	Froid/Medicine Lake (2)
2020	Missoula Sentinel (2)	Laurel (3)	Manhattan/Manhattan Christian	Drummond/Granite (Philipsburg) (9)	Froid/Medicine Lake
2019	Bozeman (6)	Custer County (Miles City) (10)	Lincoln County (Eureka) (3)	Fairview	Garfield County (Jordan)
2018	Billings West (4)	Billings Central Catholic (5)	Fairfield/Augusta (4)	Drummond/Granite (Philipsburg) (8)	Wibaux (7)
2017	Billings Senior (11)	Columbia Falls	Lincoln County (Eureka) (2)	Drummond/Granite (Philipsburg) (7)	Westby/Grenora
2016	Billings Senior (10)	Beaverhead County (Dillon) (8)	Lincoln County (Eureka)	Ennis (4)	Hot Springs (2)
2015	Bozeman (5)	Whitefish (2)	Fairfield (3)	Chinook (2)	Stanford/Denton/Geyser
2014	Glacier (Kalispell)	Beaverhead County (Dillon) (7)	Broadwater (Townsend)	Wibaux (6)	Highwood/Geraldine (13)
2013	Bozeman (4)	Beaverhead County (Dillon) (6)	Loyola Sacred Heart (Missoula) (2)	Ennis (3)	Highwood/Geraldine (12)
2012	Butte (30)	Billings Central Catholic (4)	Loyola Sacred Heart (Missoula)	Superior (2)	Hot Springs
2011	Helena Capital (11)	Beaverhead County (Dillon) (5)	Fairfield (2)	Twin Bridges (2)	Denton (3)
2010	Bozeman (3)	Custer County (Miles City) (9)	Bigfork	Chinook	Denton (2)
2009	C.M. Russell (Great Falls) (13)	Frenchtown (5)	Huntley Project (Worden) (3)	Drummond (6)	Winifred/Roy (2)
2008	Helena Capital (10)	Custer County (Miles City) (8)	Huntley Project (Worden) (2)	Superior	Highwood (11)
2007	Helena Capital (9)	Billings Central Catholic (3)	Baker/Plevna (6)	Drummond (4)	Hysham
2006	Helena Capital (8)	Beaverhead County (Dillon) (4)	Malta (3)	Centerville (2)	Highwood (10)
2005	Billings West (3)	Beaverhead County (Dillon) (3)	Cut Bank (4)	Drummond (3)	Highwood (9)
2004	C.M. Russell (Great Falls) (12)	Havre (7)	Baker (5)	Drummond (2)	Highwood (8)
2003	Billings Skyview (2)	Beaverhead County (Dillon) (2)	Baker (4)	Drummond	Geraldine (5)
2002	Helena Capital (7)	Laurel (2)	Fort Benton	Scobey (3)	Highwood (7)
2001	C.M. Russell (Great Falls) (11)	Fergus (Lewistown)	Baker (3)	Wibaux (5)	Geraldine (4)
2000	Helena Capital (6)	Beaverhead County (Dillon)	Malta (2)	Wibaux (4)	Highwood (6)
1999	Helena Capital (5)	Laurel	Baker (2)	Centerville	Blue Sky/Kremlin/Gildford
1998	Billings West (2)	Hamilton (2)	Huntley Project (Worden)	Chester	Blue Sky/Kremlin/Gildford
1997	Billings West	Hamilton	Frenchtown (4)	Gardiner	Geraldine (3)
1996	Helena Capital (4)	Custer County (Miles City) (7)	Malta	Scobey/Peerless (2)	Highwood (5)
1995	Billings Skyview	Custer County (Miles City) (6)	Frenchtown (3)	Scobey/Peerless	Highwood (4)
1994	Missoula Big Sky	Custer County (Miles City) (5)	Conrad	Belt	Highwood (3)
1993	Helena Capital (3)	Sidney (9)	Frenchtown (2)	Wibaux (3)	Highwood (2)
1992	C.M. Russell (Great Falls) (10)	Sidney (8)	Columbus (3)	Wibaux (2)	Highwood
1991	Butte (29)	Sidney (7)	Troy	Wibaux	Winifred
1990	C.M. Russell (Great Falls) (9)	Sidney (6)	Cut Bank (3)	Absarokee (3)	Denton
1989	C.M. Russell (Great Falls) (8)	Sidney (5)	Cut Bank (2)	Absarokee (2)	Geraldine (2)
1988	Great Falls (15)	Sidney (4)	Shelby	Absarokee	Dutton
1987	Helena Capital (2)	Sidney (3)	Shepherd	Terry (3)	Geyser (2)
1986	C.M. Russell (Great Falls) (7)	Glasgow (4)	Baker	Terry (2)	Moore (3)
1985	C.M. Russell (Great Falls) (6)	Custer County (Miles City) (4)	Cut Bank	Terry	Moore (2)
1984	C.M. Russell (Great Falls) (5)	Sidney (2)	Roundup (2)	Savage (2)	Moore
1983	Great Falls (14)	Glasgow (3)	Frenchtown	Savage	Geyser
1982	C.M. Russell (Great Falls) (4)	Sidney	Fairfield	Ennis (2)	Joplin/Inverness
1981	Butte (28)	Custer County (Miles City) (3)	Plentywood	Arlee	
1980	C.M. Russell (Great Falls) (3)	Glasgow (2)	Sacred Heart	Columbus (2)	
1979	Billings Senior (9)	Whitefish	Roundup	Richey	
1978	Helena Capital	Dawson County (Glendive) (7)	Belgrade (4)	Ennis	
1977	Butte (27)	Dawson County (Glendive) (6)	Belgrade (3)	Florence-Carlton	
1976	C.M. Russell (Great Falls) (2)	Glasgow	Corvallis	Charlo (2)	
1975	C.M. Russell (Great Falls)	Park (Livingston) (4)	Thompson Falls (2)	Columbus	
1974	Great Falls (13)	Ronan	Thompson Falls	Geraldine	
1973	Great Falls (12)	Butte Central Catholic (7)	Belgrade (2)	Bozeman Rosary	
1972	Missoula Sentinel	Butte Central Catholic (6)			
1971	Great Falls (11)	Butte Central Catholic (5)			
1970	Flathead (Kalispell) (6)	Havre (6)			
1969	Great Falls (10)	Butte Central Catholic (4)			
1968	Butte (26)	Billings Central Catholic (2)			
1967	Butte (25)	Libby (2)			
1966	Missoula Hellgate (11)	Only Division Champions			
1965	Great Falls (9)	Only Division Champions			
1964	Butte (24)	Only Division Champions			
1963	Missoula Hellgate (10)	Only Division Champions			
1962	Great Falls (8)	Great Falls Central Catholic (3)			
1961	Butte (23)	Havre (5)			
1960	Butte (22)	Dawson County (Glendive) (5)			
1959	Flathead (Kalispell) (5)	Havre (4)			
1958	Flathead (Kalispell) (4)	Custer County (Miles City) (2) & Great Falls Central Catholic (2)^{†}			
1957	Missoula Hellgate (9)	Great Falls Central Catholic			
1956	Great Falls (7)	Billings Central Catholic			
1955	Missoula Hellgate (8)	Havre (3)			
1954	Great Falls (7)	Dawson County (Glendive) (4)			
1953	Missoula Hellgate (7)	Dawson County (Glendive) (3)			
1952	Missoula Hellgate (6)	Butte Central Catholic (3)		Twin Bridges	
1951	Flathead (Kalispell) (3)	Anaconda (5)		Harlem	
1950	Flathead (Kalispell) (2)	Anaconda (4)		Charlo	
1949	Great Falls (6)	Dawson County (Glendive) (2)		Belgrade	
1948	Great Falls (5)	Butte Central Catholic (2)			
1947	Billings (8)	Park (Livingston) (3)			
1946	Missoula Hellgate (5)	Dawson County (Glendive)			
1945	Missoula Hellgate (4)	Butte Central Catholic			
1944	Missoula Hellgate (3)	Anaconda (3)			
1943	Missoula Hellgate (2)	Anaconda (2)			
1942	Cancelled due to WWII.				
1941	Butte (21)	Havre (2)			
1940	Butte (20)	Glendive			
1939	Billings (7)	Flathead (Kalispell)			
1938	Billings (6)				
1937	Butte (19)				
1936	Great Falls (4)				
1935	Butte (18)				
1934	Billings (5)				
1933	Billings (4)				
1932	Helena (2)	Libby			
1931	Butte (17)	Harlowton (2)			
1930	Butte (16)	Harlowton			
1929	Butte (15)				
1928	Custer County (Miles City) (2)				
1927	Butte (14)				
1926	Havre				
1925	Great Falls (3)				
1924	Butte (13)				
1923	Billings (3)				
1922	Custer County (Miles City)				
1921	Missoula Hellgate				
1920	Anaconda				
1919	Billings (2)				
1918	Cancelled due to flu epidemic.				
1917	Bozeman (2)				
1916	Butte (12)				
1915	Butte (11)				
1914	Billings & Butte (10)^{†}				
1913	Butte (9)				
1912	Bozeman				
1911	Butte (8)				
1910	Butte (7)				
1909	Park (Livingston) (2)				
1908	Butte (6)				
1907	Butte (5)				
1906	Great Falls (2) & Park (Livingston)^{†}				
1905	Great Falls				
1904	Butte (4)				
1903	Butte (3)				
1902	Fort Shaw & Helena^{†}				
1901	Butte (2)				
1900	Butte				

^{†} Co-Champions

== Golf MHSA State Champions ==
=== Boys ===
Year	AA	A	B	C
2026-27*	Missoula Sentinel (13)	Billings Central Catholic (7)		
2025-26*	Missoula Sentinel (12)	Corvallis	Florence-Carlton	Scobey (3)
2024-25*	Glacier (Kalispell) (4)	Laurel (14)	Jefferson (Boulder) (3)	Scobey (2)
2023-24*	Glacier (Kalispell) (3)	Polson (2)	Jefferson (Boulder) (2)	Scobey
2022-23^{*}	Helena Capital (3)	Laurel (13)	Anaconda	Highwood
2021-22^{*}	Gallatin (Bozeman)	Laurel (12)	Jefferson (Boulder)	Manhattan Christian (6)
2020-21^{*}	Missoula Sentinel (11)	Whitefish (13)	Columbus (7)	Manhattan Christian (5)
2019-20^{*}	Bozeman (4)	Laurel (11)	Cancelled due to COVID-19 pandemic.	
2018-19^{*}	Bozeman (3)	Laurel (10)	Loyola Sacred Heart (Missoula) (7)	Manhattan Christian (4)
2017-18^{*}	C.M. Russell (Great Falls) (4)	Laurel (9)	Shelby (3)	Manhattan Christian (3)
2016-17^{*}	Billings West (18)	Hamilton (7)	Loyola Sacred Heart (Missoula) (6)	Harlowton (2)
2015-16^{*}	Billings West (17)	Billings Central Catholic (6)	Bigfork	Harlowton
2014-15^{*}	Billings West (16)	Hamilton (6)	Thompson Falls	Seeley-Swan (2)
2013-14^{*}	Billings West (15)	Sidney (2)	Columbus (6)	Lone Peak (Big Sky) (2)
2012-13^{*}	Glacier (Kalispell) (2)	Belgrade	Loyola Sacred Heart (Missoula) (5)	Lone Peak (Big Sky)
2011-12^{*}	Billings West (14)	Hamilton (5)	Loyola Sacred Heart (Missoula) (4)	Manhattan Christian (2)
2010-11^{*}	Billings Senior (9)	Hamilton (4)	Loyola Sacred Heart (Missoula) (3)	Fort Benton (3)
2009-10^{*}	Billings West (13)	Whitefish (12)	Loyola Sacred Heart (Missoula) (2)	Fort Benton (2)
2008-09^{*}	Billings West (12)	Whitefish (11)	Loyola Sacred Heart (Missoula)	Sunburst (2)
2007-08^{*}	Billings West (11) & Glacier (Kalispell)^{†}	Hamilton (3)	Shepherd	Gardiner (2)
2006-07^{*}	Billings West (10)	Whitefish (10)	Powell County (Deer Lodge) (2)	Sunburst
2005-06^{*}	Billings Skyview (3)	Whitefish (9)	Seeley-Swan	Fairview (2)
2004-05^{*}	Billings West (9)	Whitefish (8)	Powell County (Deer Lodge)	Fairview
2003-04^{*}	C.M. Russell (Great Falls) (3)	Billings Central Catholic (5)	Conrad (5)	Gardiner
2003	Billings Senior (8)	Beaverhead County (Dillon)	Conrad (4)	Manhattan Christian
2002	Billings Senior (7)	Havre (2)	Conrad (3)	Superior
2001	Billings Senior (6)	Havre	Frenchtown	Westby
2000	Missoula Big Sky	Whitefish (7)	Fort Benton	St. Regis
1999	Missoula Sentinel (10)	Laurel (8)	Cut Bank (4)	
1998	Billings Senior (5)	Laurel (7)	Three Forks	
1997	Bozeman (2)	Laurel (6)	Columbus (5)	
1996	Billings Skyview (2)	Polson	Columbus (4)	
1995	Billings West (8)	Dawson County (Glendive) (2)	Columbus (3)	
1994	C.M. Russell (Great Falls) (2)	Billings Central Catholic (4)	Columbus (2)	
1993	Billings West (7)	Billings Central Catholic (3)	Columbus & Forsyth (2)^{†}	
1992	Billings West (6)	Sidney	Cut Bank (3)	
1991	Billings West (5)	Libby	Cut Bank (2)	
1990	Billings West (4)	Whitefish (6)	Conrad (2)	
1989	C.M. Russell (Great Falls)	Butte Central Catholic (2)	Conrad	
1988	Missoula Sentinel (9)	Whitefish (5)	Shelby (2)	
1987	Helena Capital (2)	Dawson County (Glendive)	Forsyth	
1986	Helena Capital	Hamilton (2)	Billings Skyview	
1985	Bozeman	Hamilton	Wolf Point	
1984	Billings Senior (4)	Whitefish (4)	Cut Bank	
1983	Flathead (Kalispell) (2)	Whitefish (3)	Shelby	
1982	Billings Senior (3)	Laurel (5)		
1981	Helena (2)	Whitefish (2)		
1980	Helena	Laurel (4)		
1979	Missoula Sentinel (8)	Laurel (3)		
1978	Billings West (3)	Butte Central Catholic		
1977	Billings West (2)			
1976	Laurel (2)			
1975	Missoula Sentinel (7)			
1974	Laurel			
1973	Billings Central Catholic (2)			
1972	Missoula Sentinel (6)			
1971	Billings Central Catholic			
1970	Missoula Sentinel (5)			
1969	Missoula Sentinel (4)			
1968	Missoula Sentinel (3)			
1967	Missoula Sentinel (2)			
1966	Flathead (Kalispell)			
1965	Missoula Sentinel			
1964	Missoula Hellgate (3)			
1963	Great Falls (2)			
1962	Billings West			
1961	Billings (2)			
1960	Whitefish			
1959	Missoula Hellgate (2)			
1958	Billings			
1957	Missoula Hellgate			
1956	Great Falls			

^{†} Co-Champions

^{*} Beginning in the 2003-04 school year, Class AA and Class A switched golf from a spring sport to a fall sport. Thus all Class AA and Class A championships since then have been awarded in the fall, while all Class B and Class C championships have continued to be awarded in the spring.

=== Girls ===
Year	AA	A	B	C
2026-27*	Billings Senior (7)	Whitefish (19)		
2025-26*	Bozeman (19)	Billings Central Catholic (12)	Lone Peak (Big Sky) (2)	Savage (2)
2024-25*	Gallatin (Bozeman)	Billings Central Catholic (11)	Florence-Carlton	Savage
2023-24*	Billings Senior (6)	Polson (6)	Lone Peak (Big Sky)	Broadus
2022-23^{*}	Billings Senior (5)	Polson (5)	Shelby (7)	Manhattan Christian (7)
2021-22^{*}	Billings West (9)	Laurel (5)	Columbus (2)	Manhattan Christian (6)
2020-21^{*}	Bozeman (18)	Laurel (4)	Columbus	Manhattan Christian (5)
2019-20^{*}	Bozeman (17)	Laurel (3)	Cancelled due to COVID-19 pandemic.	
2018-19^{*}	Bozeman (16)	Laurel (2)	Loyola Sacred Heart (Missoula) (4)	Manhattan Christian (4)
2017-18^{*}	Bozeman (15)	Sidney (3)	Loyola Sacred Heart (Missoula) (3)	Manhattan Christian (3)
2016-17^{*}	Bozeman (14)	Sidney (2)	Three Forks (10)	Manhattan Christian (2)
2015-16^{*}	Great Falls (4)	Whitefish (18)	Three Forks (9)	Lone Peak (Big Sky)
2014-15^{*}	Billings West (8)	Whitefish (17)	Loyola Sacred Heart (Missoula) (2)	Sunburst
2013-14^{*}	Billings West (7)	Polson (4)	Broadwater (Townsend) (3)	Belt
2012-13^{*}	Billings Senior (4)	Polson (3)	Broadwater (Townsend) (2)	Harlowton/Judith Gap (3)
2011-12^{*}	Bozeman (13)	Polson (2)	Malta	Harlowton/Judith Gap (2)
2010-11^{*}	C.M. Russell (Great Falls) (2)	Billings Central Catholic (10)	Loyola Sacred Heart (Missoula)	Fort Benton (7)
2009-10^{*}	Bozeman (12)	Billings Central Catholic (9)	Three Forks (8)	Fort Benton (6)
2008-09^{*}	C.M. Russell (Great Falls)	Billings Central Catholic (8)	Three Forks (7)	Harlowton
2007-08^{*}	Bozeman (11)	Whitefish (16)	Three Forks (6)	Centerville
2006-07^{*}	Billings West (6)	Whitefish (15)	Three Forks (5)	Scobey (3)
2005-06^{*}	Billings Skyview (3)	Polson	Broadwater (Townsend)	Gardiner (2)
2004-05^{*}	Bozeman (10)	Custer County (Miles City) (3)	Shelby (6)	Gardiner
2003-04^{*}	Bozeman (9)	Colstrip	Three Forks (4)	Scobey (2)
2003	Helena	Billings Central Catholic (7)	Three Forks (3)	Superior
2002	Bozeman (8)	Beaverhead County (Dillon)	Three Forks (2)	Scobey
2001	Bozeman (7)	Custer County (Miles City) (2)	Three Forks	Manhattan Christian
2000	Great Falls (3)	Custer County (Miles City)	Plentywood (2)	St. Regis
1999	Bozeman (6)	Whitefish (14)	Plentywood	
1998	Bozeman (5)	Whitefish (13)	Forsyth	
1997	Billings Skyview (2)	Whitefish (12)	Fort Benton (5)	
1996	Billings Skyview	Whitefish (11)	Fort Benton (4)	
1995	Bozeman (4)	Whitefish (10)	Shelby (5)	
1994	Bozeman (3)	Sidney & Whitefish (9)^{†}	Fort Benton (3)	
1993	Bozeman (2)	Whitefish (8)	Fort Benton (2)	
1992	Bozeman	Billings Central Catholic (6)	Fort Benton	
1991	Flathead (Kalispell) (4)	Havre	Roundup (2)	
1990	Billings West (5)	Whitefish (7)	Conrad	
1989	Billings West (4)	Whitefish (6)	Shelby (4)	
1988	Billings West (3)	Whitefish (5)	Cut Bank (2)	
1987	Billings Senior (3)	Whitefish (4)	Troy	
1986	Billings Senior (2)	Whitefish (3)	Cut Bank	
1985	Butte (2)	Billings Central Catholic (5)	Shelby (3)	
1984	Butte	Billings Central Catholic (4)	Shelby (2)	
1983	Libby (2)	Billings Central Catholic (3)	Shelby	
1982	Libby	Whitefish (2)		
1981	Billings West (2)	Whitefish		
1980	Billings West	Hamilton (2)		
1979	Missoula Sentinel (3)	Hamilton		
1978	Missoula Sentinel (2)	Billings Central Catholic (2)		
1977	Billings Central Catholic			
1976	Great Falls (2)			
1975	Roundup			
1974	Great Falls			
1973	Billings Senior			
1972	Missoula Sentinel			
1971	Laurel			
1970	Flathead (Kalispell) (3)			
1969	Missoula Hellgate (2)			
1968	Missoula Hellgate			
1967	Flathead (Kalispell) (2)			
1966	Flathead (Kalispell)			

^{†} Co-Champions

^{*} Beginning in the 2003-04 school year, Class AA and Class A switched golf from a spring sport to a fall sport. Thus all Class AA and Class A championships since then have been awarded in the fall, while all Class B and Class C championships have continued to be awarded in the spring.

== Soccer MHSA State Champions ==
=== Boys ===
Year	AA	A
2026	Missoula Sentinel (5)	Billings Central Catholic (3)
2025	Gallatin (Bozeman)	Polson
2024	Billings Senior (3)	Billings Central Catholic (2)
2023	Bozeman (6)	Whitefish (10)
2022	Missoula Hellgate (8)	Columbia Falls (4)
2021	Missoula Hellgate (7)	Whitefish (9)
2020	Missoula Hellgate (6)	Whitefish (8)
2019	Missoula Hellgate (5)	Whitefish (7)
2018	Bozeman (5)	Whitefish (6)
2017	Missoula Hellgate (4)	Belgrade (2)
2016	Missoula Hellgate (3)	Belgrade
2015	Missoula Hellgate (2)	Corvallis (2)
2014	Bozeman (4)	Corvallis
2013	Bozeman (3)	Park (Livingston)
2012	Bozeman (2)	Whitefish (5)
2011	Missoula Hellgate	Whitefish (4)
2010	Helena (4)	Libby (2)
2009	Billings West (2)	Billings Central Catholic
2008	Billings West	Libby
2007	Helena (3)	Whitefish (3)
2006	Flathead (Kalispell) (5)	Whitefish (2)
2005	Flathead (Kalispell) (4)	Columbia Falls (3)
2004	Billings Senior (2)	Hamilton
2003	Helena (2)	Columbia Falls (2)
2002	Helena	Whitefish
2001	Helena Capital (2)	Columbia Falls
2000	Missoula Sentinel (4)	
1999	Billings Senior	
1998	Flathead (Kalispell) (3)	
1997	Helena Capital	
1996	Bozeman	
1995	Flathead (Kalispell) (2)	
1994	Flathead (Kalispell)	
1993	Missoula Sentinel (3)	
1992	Missoula Sentinel (2)	
1991	Missoula Sentinel	

=== Girls ===
Year	AA	A
2026	Missoula Sentinel	Whitefish (4)
2025	Billings Senior (3)	Columbia Falls (2)
2024	Bozeman (10)	Billings Central Catholic (11)
2023	Bozeman (9)	Whitefish (3)
2022	Gallatin (Bozeman)	Billings Central Catholic (10)
2021	Billings West (4)	Laurel (5)
2020	Glacier (Kalispell)	Laurel (4)
2019	Billings West (3)	Laurel (3)
2018	Billings Skyview	Billings Central Catholic (9)
2017	Helena (3)	Laurel (2)
2016	Bozeman (8)	Billings Central Catholic (8)
2015	Helena (2)	Billings Central Catholic (7)
2014	C.M. Russell (Great Falls)	Laurel
2013	Billings Senior (2)	Billings Central Catholic (6)
2012	Bozeman (7)	Billings Central Catholic (5)
2011	Billings Senior	Billings Central Catholic (4)
2010	Billings West (2)	Billings Central Catholic (3)
2009	Billings West	Billings Central Catholic (2)
2008	Bozeman (6)	Billings Central Catholic
2007	Bozeman (5)	Belgrade (2)
2006	Bozeman (4)	Whitefish (2)
2005	Helena Capital (8)	Belgrade
2004	Helena Capital (7)	Columbia Falls
2003	Helena Capital (6)	Corvallis
2002	Helena	Hamilton
2001	Bozeman (3)	Whitefish
2000	Helena Capital (5)	
1999	Helena Capital (4)	
1998	Helena Capital (3)	
1997	Helena Capital (2)	
1996	Helena Capital	
1995	Missoula Big Sky (2)	
1994	Missoula Big Sky	
1993	Flathead (Kalispell)	
1992	Bozeman (2)	
1991	Bozeman	

== Softball MHSA State Champions ==
Year	AA	A	B-C
2026	Billings West (4)	Laurel (2)	Shepherd (2)
2025	Glacier (Kalispell) (3)	Frenchtown (13)	Shepherd
2024	Helena Capital (3)	Columbia Falls (2)	Manhattan
2023	Glacier (Kalispell) (2)	Columbia Falls	Conrad/Choteau (3)
2022	Billings Senior (10)	Frenchtown (12)	Florence-Carlton (12)
2021	Belgrade (4)	Polson (8)	Florence-Carlton (11)
2020	Cancelled due to COVID-19 pandemic.		
2019	Great Falls (3)	Belgrade (3)	Huntley Project (Worden)
2018	Great Falls (2)	Belgrade (2)	Florence-Carlton (10)
2017	C.M. Russell (Great Falls) (9)	Belgrade	Florence-Carlton (9)
2016	C.M. Russell (Great Falls) (8)	Frenchtown/Alberton (11)	Conrad/Choteau (2)
2015	Glacier (Kalispell)	Frenchtown/Alberton (10)	Conrad/Choteau
2014	Billings West (3)	Frenchtown/Alberton (9)	Florence-Carlton (8)
2013	Great Falls	Frenchtown/Alberton (8)	Florence-Carlton (7)
2012	C.M. Russell (Great Falls) (7)	Polson (7)	Florence-Carlton (6)
2011	Butte (3)	Polson (6)	Columbus/Absarokee/Park City (4)
2010	Billings West (2)	Polson (5)	Thompson Falls/Noxon
2009	Helena Capital (2)	Frenchtown (7)	Columbus/Absarokee/Park City (3)
2008	Billings Senior (9)	Libby (5)	Columbus/Absarokee/Park City (2)
2007	C.M. Russell (Great Falls) (6)	Polson (4)	Columbus/Absarokee/Park City
2006	Missoula Big Sky (2)	Laurel	Florence-Carlton (5)
2005	Missoula Big Sky	Frenchtown (6)	Florence-Carlton (4)
2004	Helena Capital	Polson (3)	Florence-Carlton (3)
2003	Flathead (Kalispell)	Hamilton	Loyola Sacred Heart (Missoula)
2002	Billings Senior (8)	Polson (2)	Frenchtown (5)
2001	C.M. Russell (Great Falls) (5)	Polson	Florence-Carlton (2)
2000	C.M. Russell (Great Falls) (4)	Butte Central Catholic (3)	Florence-Carlton
1999	C.M. Russell (Great Falls) (3)	Butte Central Catholic (2)	Frenchtown (4)
1998	C.M. Russell (Great Falls) (2)	Libby (4)	Frenchtown (3)
1997	C.M. Russell (Great Falls)	Butte Central Catholic	Frenchtown (2)
1996	Cancelled (Rain Out)	Cancelled (Rain Out)	Frenchtown
1995	Butte (2)	Billings Central Catholic (2)	
1994	Billings Senior (7)	Billings Central Catholic	
1993	Billings Senior (6)	Libby (3)	
1992	Butte	Libby (2)	
1991	Billings Senior (5)	Libby	
1990	Billings Senior (4)		
1989	Billings West		
1988	Billings Senior (3)		
1987	Billings Senior (2)		
1986	Billings Senior		

== Swimming MHSA State Champions ==
=== Boys ===
Year	AA	A
2026	Bozeman (21)	Billings Central Catholic (18)
2025	Bozeman (20)	Billings Central Catholic (17)
2024	Bozeman (19)	Billings Central Catholic (16)
2023	Missoula Hellgate (11)	Billings Central Catholic (15)
2022	Missoula Sentinel	Billings Central Catholic (14)
2021	Helena (3)	Billings Central Catholic (13)
2020	Bozeman (18)	Whitefish
2019	Missoula Hellgate (10)	Billings Central Catholic (12) & Havre (15)^{†}
2018	Missoula Hellgate (9)	Billings Central Catholic (11)
2017	Missoula Hellgate (8)	Billings Central Catholic (10)
2016	Missoula Hellgate (7)	Columbia Falls
2015	Missoula Hellgate (6)	Billings Central Catholic (9)
2014	Missoula Hellgate (5)	Billings Central Catholic (8)
2013	Helena (2)	Billings Central Catholic (7)
2012	Bozeman (17)	Billings Central Catholic (6)
2011	Helena	Billings Central Catholic (5)
2010	C.M. Russell (Great Falls) (4)	Billings Central Catholic (4) & Havre/Chinook (14)^{†}
2009	Bozeman (16)	Hardin (3)
2008	Missoula Hellgate (4)	Hardin (2)
2007	Bozeman (15)	Havre (13)
2006	Bozeman (14)	Billings Central Catholic (3)
2005	Bozeman (13)	Billings Central Catholic (2)
2004	Bozeman (12)	Billings Central Catholic
2003	Bozeman (11)	Havre (12)
2002	Missoula Hellgate (3)	Havre (11)
2001	Bozeman (10)	Havre (10)
2000	Bozeman (9)	Havre (9)
1999	Billings Senior (4)	Hardin
1998	Bozeman (8)	Havre (8)
1997	Bozeman (7)	Havre (7)
1996	Missoula Hellgate (2)	Butte Central Catholic/Anaconda
1995	Billings Senior (3)	
1994	Billings Senior (2)	
1993	Bozeman (6)	
1992	Bozeman (5)	
1991	Bozeman (4)	
1990	Billings West (3)	
1989	Billings West (2)	
1988	Helena Capital (3)	
1987	Helena Capital (2)	
1986	Flatehead (Kalispell)	
1985	Bozeman (3)	
1984	Bozeman (2)	
1983	Bozeman	
1982	Great Falls (2)	
1981	Great Falls	
1980	Helena Capital	
1979	Billings West	
1978	C.M. Russell (Great Falls) (3)	
1977	Havre (6)	
1976	Billings Senior	
1975	C.M. Russell (Great Falls) (2)	
1974	C.M. Russell (Great Falls)	
1973	Havre (5)	
1972	Havre (4)	
1971	Havre (3)	
1970	Havre (2)	
1969	Havre & Missoula Hellgate^{†}	

^{†} Co-Champions

=== Girls ===
Year	AA	A
2026	Billings West (3)	Billings Central Catholic (17)
2025	Great Falls (6)	Billings Central Catholic (16)
2024	Missoula Sentinel (2)	Billings Central Catholic (15)
2023	Great Falls (5)	Billings Central Catholic (14)
2022	Great Falls (4)	Billings Central Catholic (13)
2021	Bozeman (15)	Billings Central Catholic (12)
2020	Bozeman (14)	Billings Central Catholic (11)
2019	Missoula Hellgate (10)	Whitefish (2)
2018	Missoula Hellgate (9)	Billings Central Catholic (10)
2017	Missoula Hellgate (8)	Whitefish
2016	Missoula Hellgate (7)	Havre/Chinook (13)
2015	Missoula Hellgate (6)	Billings Central Catholic (9)
2014	Missoula Hellgate (5)	Billings Central Catholic (8)
2013	Helena (2)	Billings Central Catholic (7)
2012	C.M. Russell (Great Falls) (7) & Helena^{†}	Billings Central Catholic (6)
2011	C.M. Russell (Great Falls) (6)	Billings Central Catholic (5)
2010	C.M. Russell (Great Falls) (5)	Billings Central Catholic (4)
2009	C.M. Russell (Great Falls) (4)	Havre (12)
2008	C.M. Russell (Great Falls) (3)	Havre (11)
2007	Bozeman (13)	Havre (10)
2006	Bozeman (12)	Havre (9)
2005	Billings West (2) & Flathead (Kalispell) (8)^{†}	Havre (8)
2004	Billings West	Havre (7)
2003	Flathead (Kalispell) (7)	Havre (6)
2002	Bozeman (11)	Havre (5)
2001	Bozeman (10)	Havre (4)
2000	Bozeman (9)	Havre (3)
1999	Bozeman (8)	Billings Central Catholic (3)
1998	Bozeman (7)	Billings Central Catholic (2)
1997	Bozeman (6)	Billings Central Catholic
1996	Bozeman (5)	Hardin
1995	Flathead (Kalispell) (6)	
1994	Billings Senior (3)	
1993	Billings Senior (2)	
1992	Flathead (Kalispell) (5)	
1991	Flathead (Kalispell) (4)	
1990	Flathead (Kalispell) (3)	
1989	C.M. Russell (Great Falls) (2)	
1988	Missoula Hellgate (4)	
1987	C.M. Russell (Great Falls) & Missoula Hellgate (3)^{†}	
1986	Bozeman (4)	
1985	Bozeman (3)	
1984	Bozeman (2)	
1983	Bozeman	
1982	Flathead (Kalispell) (2)	
1981	Flathead (Kalispell)	
1980	Missoula Hellgate (2)	
1979	Missoula Hellgate	
1978	Great Falls (3)	
1977	Great Falls (2)	
1976	Great Falls	
1975	Billings Senior	
1974	Havre (2)	
1973	Missoula Sentinel	
1972	Butte (3)	
1971	Havre	
1970	Butte (2)	
1969	Butte	

^{†} Co-Champions

== Tennis MHSA State Champions ==
=== Boys ===
Year	AA	A	B-C
2026	C.M. Russell (Great Falls) (7)	Whitefish (11)	Valley Christian (Missoula) (9)
2025	C.M. Russell (Great Falls) (6)	Whitefish (10)	Valley Christian (Missoula) (8)
2024	C.M. Russell (Great Falls) (5)	Billings Central Catholic (9)	Loyola Sacred Heart (Missoula) (7)
2023	Gallatin (Bozeman)	Polson (2)	Loyola Sacred Heart (Missoula) (6)
2022	Bozeman (15) & C.M. Russell (Great Falls) (4)^{†}	Billings Central Catholic (8) & Whitefish (9)^{†}	Loyola Sacred Heart (Missoula) (5)
2021	Glacier (Kalispell) (2)	Havre (7)	Loyola Sacred Heart (Missoula) (4)
2020	Cancelled due to COVID-19 pandemic.		
2019	Missoula Sentinel (2)	Beaverhead County (Dillon)	Great Falls Central Catholic (2)
2018	Billings Senior (7)	Corvallis (5) & Hardin & Whitefish (8)^{†}	Great Falls Central Catholic
2017	Bozeman (14)	Billings Central Catholic (7)	Libby (2)
2016	Bozeman (13)	Billings Central Catholic (6)	Libby
2015	Billings West (18)	Billings Central Catholic (5)	Loyola Sacred Heart (Missoula) (3)
2014	Bozeman (12)	Billings Central Catholic (4)	Loyola Sacred Heart (Missoula) (2)
2013	Glacier (Kalispell)	Billings Central Catholic (3) & Polson^{†}	Loyola Sacred Heart (Missoula)
2012	Missoula Hellgate (3)	Corvallis (4)	Conrad
2011	Missoula Hellgate (2)	Corvallis (3)	Valley Christian (Missoula) (7)
2010	Missoula Hellgate	Corvallis (2)	Bigfork (7)
2009	Bozeman (11)	Billings Central Catholic (2)	Cut Bank (8)
2008	Bozeman (10)	Whitefish (7)	Cut Bank (7)
2007	Bozeman (9)	Billings Central Catholic	Cut Bank (6)
2006	Billings West (17) & Bozeman (8)^{†}	Corvallis	Cut Bank (5)
2005	Billings Senior (6)	Havre (6)	Cut Bank (4)
2004	C.M. Russell (Great Falls) (3)	Havre (5)	Cut Bank (3)
2003	Billings Senior (5)	Havre (4)	Cut Bank (2)
2002	Bozeman (7)	Havre (3)	Cut Bank
2001	Bozeman (6)	Havre (2)	Valley Christian (Missoula) (6)
2000	Great Falls	Havre	Valley Christian (Missoula) (5)
1999	C.M. Russell (Great Falls) (2)	Dawson County (Glendive) (13)	Valley Christian (Missoula) (4)
1998	C.M. Russell (Great Falls)	Dawson County (Glendive) (12)	Valley Christian (Missoula) (3)
1997	Billings West (16)	Custer County (Miles City)	Bigfork (6)
1996	Flathead (Kalispell) (2)	Stevensville (2)	Bigfork (5)
1995	Flathead (Kalispell)	Dawson County (Glendive) (11)	Bigfork (4)
1994	Billings West (15)	Dawson County (Glendive) (10)	Bigfork (3)
1993	Bozeman (5)	Dawson County (Glendive) (9)	Valley Christian (Missoula) (2)
1992	Bozeman (4)	Stevensville	Valley Christian (Missoula)
1991	Bozeman (3)	Dawson County (Glendive) (8) & Hamilton^{†}	Bigfork (2)
1990	Bozeman (2)	Whitefish (6)	Bigfork
1989	Billings West (14)	Whitefish (5)	
1988	Billings West (13)	Whitefish (4)	
1987	Billings West (12)	Dawson County (Glendive) (7)	
1986	Billings West (11)	Dawson County (Glendive) (6)	
1985	Billings Senior (4)	Dawson County (Glendive) (5)	
1984	Billings West (10)	Whitefish (3)	
1983	Billings West (9)	Dawson County (Glendive) (4)	
1982	Billings West (8)	Dawson County (Glendive) (3)	
1981	Billings West (7)	Whitefish (2)	
1980	Billings West (6)	Whitefish	
1979	Billings West (5)	Dawson County (Glendive) (2)	
1978	Billings West (4)	Dawson County (Glendive)	
1977	Billings Senior (3)		
1976	Billings West (3)		
1975	Billings West (2)		
1974	Bozeman		
1973	Billings Senior (2)		
1972	Billings Senior		
1971	Billings West		
1970	Missoula Sentinel		

^{†} Co-Champions

=== Girls ===
Year	AA	A	B-C
2026	Missoula Hellgate (6)	Whitefish (4)	Superior (3)
2025	Gallatin (Bozeman)	Custer County (Miles City) (5)	Fairfield (4)
2024	Missoula Hellgate (5)	Billings Central Catholic (3)	Chinook (5)
2023	Missoula Hellgate (4)	Custer County (Miles City) (4)	Simms
2022	Bozeman (22)	Billings Central Catholic (2)	Loyola Sacred Heart (Missoula) (3)
2021	Bozeman (21)	Polson (4)	Loyola Sacred Heart (Missoula) (2)
2020	Cancelled due to COVID-19 pandemic.		
2019	Bozeman (20)	Whitefish (3)	Loyola Sacred Heart (Missoula)
2018	Bozeman (19)	Polson (3)	Choteau
2017	Bozeman (18)	Billings Central Catholic & Dawson County (Glendive) (12)^{†}	Broadwater (Townsend) (4)
2016	Bozeman (17)	Whitefish (2)	Chinook (4)
2015	Bozeman (16)	Park (Livingston) (7)	Chinook (3)
2014	Bozeman (15)	Corvallis (2)	Chinook (2)
2013	Bozeman (14)	Corvallis	Fairfield (3)
2012	Bozeman (13)	Polson (2)	Conrad (2)
2011	Glacier (Kalispell) (2)	Park (Livingston) (6)	Cut Bank
2010	Glacier (Kalispell)	Dawson County (Glendive) (11)	Chinook
2009	Great Falls (5)	Havre (3)	Broadwater (Townsend) (3)
2008	Bozeman (12)	Polson	Broadwater (Townsend) (2)
2007	Billings Senior (6)	Park (Livingston) (5)	Broadwater (Townsend)
2006	C.M. Russell (Great Falls) (2)	Havre (2)	Fairfield (2)
2005	Bozeman (11)	Beaverhead County (Dillon)	Fairfield
2004	Bozeman (10)	Whitefish	Jefferson (Boulder) (4)
2003	Bozeman (9)	Park (Livingston) (4)	Jefferson (Boulder) (3)
2002	Billings West (10)	Havre	Jefferson (Boulder) (2)
2001	Bozeman (8)	Park (Livingston) (3)	Jefferson (Boulder)
2000	Flathead (Kalispell)	Park (Livingston) (2)	Conrad
1999	Bozeman (7)	Park (Livingston)	Superior (2)
1998	Bozeman (6)	Stevensville	Superior
1997	Helena	Hardin	Bigfork (11)
1996	Billings West (9)	Dawson County (Glendive) (10)	Bigfork (10)
1995	Billings West (8)	Columbia Falls	Bigfork (9)
1994	Billings West (7)	Dawson County (Glendive) (9)	Bigfork (8)
1993	Billings West (6)	Dawson County (Glendive) (8)	Bigfork (7)
1992	Missoula Hellgate (3)	Custer County (Miles City) (3)	Bigfork (6)
1991	Missoula Hellgate (2)	Dawson County (Glendive) (7)	Bigfork (5)
1990	Missoula Hellgate	Custer County (Miles City) (2)	Bigfork (4)
1989	Bozeman (5)	Fergus (Lewistown)	
1988	Billings West (5)	Bigfork (3)	
1987	Billings West (4)	Bigfork (2)	
1986	Bozeman (4)	Bigfork	
1985	Bozeman (3)	Custer County (Miles City) (2)	
1984	Billings West (3)	Dawson County (Glendive) (6)	
1983	Billings West (2)	Dawson County (Glendive) (5)	
1982	Billings West	Dawson County (Glendive) (4)	
1981	Billings Senior (5)	Dawson County (Glendive) (3)	
1980	Billings Senior (4)	Custer County (Miles City) & Dawson County (Glendive) (2)^{†}	
1979	Billings Senior (3)	Hamilton (2)	
1978	Hamilton	Dawson County (Glendive)	
1977	Bozeman (2)		
1976	Bozeman		
1975	Great Falls (4)		
1974	Great Falls (3)		
1973	C.M. Russell (Great Falls) & Great Falls (2) & Missoula Sentinel^{†}		
1972	Great Falls		
1971	Billings Senior (2)		
1970	Billings Senior		

^{†} Co-Champions

== Track and Field MHSA State Champions ==
=== Boys ===
Year	AA	A	B	C
2026	Billings West (15)	Laurel (6)	Columbus (4)	Cascade (7)
2025	Flathead (Kalispell) (9)	Corvallis (9)	Loyola Sacred Heart (Missoula) (4)	Manhattan Christian (2)
2024	Gallatin (Bozeman) (2)	Corvallis (8)	Jefferson (Boulder) (8)	Belt
2023	Gallatin (Bozeman) &Helena Capital (3)^{†}	Corvallis (7)	Jefferson (Boulder) (7)	Manhattan Christian
2022	Missoula Sentinel (3)	Beaverhead County (Dillon) (3)	Jefferson (Boulder) (6)	Seeley-Swan
2021	Missoula Sentinel (2)	Hamilton (7)	Jefferson (Boulder) (5)	Fort Benton (5)
2020	Cancelled due to COVID-19 pandemic.			
2019	Missoula Sentinel	Beaverhead County (Dillon) (2) & Laurel (5)^{†}	Huntley Project (Worden) (4)	Scobey
2018	Glacier (Kalispell)	Corvallis (6)	Forsyth (2)	Ennis (4)
2017	Billings West (14)	Sidney (4)	Fairfield	Ennis (3)
2016	Billings West (13)	Beaverhead County (Dillon)	Manhattan (7)	Ennis (2)
2015	Flathead (Kalispell) (8) & Helena (8)^{†}	Corvallis (5)	Manhattan (6)	Ennis
2014	Missoula Big Sky (2)	Hamilton (6)	Manhattan (5)	Charlo (5)
2013	Missoula Big Sky	Whitefish (9)	Manhattan (4)	Charlo (4)
2012	Billings West (12)	Corvallis (4)	Manhattan (3)	Charlo (3) & Darby (2)^{†}
2011	Billings Senior (5)	Columbia Falls	Darby	Charlo (2)
2010	Billings Skyview (3)	Corvallis (3)	Columbus (3)	Joliet (2)
2009	Billings West (11)	Corvallis (2)	Manhattan (2)	Harlowton (4)
2008	Billings West (10)	Whitefish (8)	Manhattan	Hinsdale/Saco
2007	Billings West (9)	Libby (3)	Huntley Project (Worden) (3)	Joliet
2006	Billings West (8)	Whitefish (7)	Huntley Project (Worden) (2)	Big Sandy
2005	Helena (7)	Colstrip (5)	Loyola Sacred Heart (Missoula) (3)	Drummond
2004	Helena Capital (3)	Whitefish (6)	Conrad (3)	Harlowton (3)
2003	Flathead (Kalispell) (7)	Whitefish (5)	Fort Benton (4)	Kremlin/Gilford
2002	Flathead (Kalispell) (6)	Colstrip (4)	Thompson Falls	Kremlin/Gilford
2001	Flathead (Kalispell) (5)	Colstrip (3)	Fort Benton (3)	Kremlin/Gilford
2000	Flathead (Kalispell) (4)	Colstrip (2)	Plains/Seeley-Swan	Kremlin/Gilford
1999	Helena Capital (2)	Billings Central Catholic	Roundup (2)	Kremlin/Gilford
1998	Helena Capital	Whitefish (4)	Jefferson (Boulder) (4)	Harlowton (2)
1997	Helena (6)	Whitefish (3)	Jefferson (Boulder) (3)	Harlowton
1996	Flathead (Kalispell) (3)	Polson (8)	Roundup & Shelby (5)^{†}	Scobey
1995	Flathead (Kalispell) (2)	Colstrip	Shelby (4)	Absarokee (2)
1994	Billings West (7)	Custer County (Miles City) (8)	Shelby (3)	Cascade (6)
1993	Billings Skyview (2)	Dawson County (Glendive) (4)	Arlee	Garfield County (Jordan)
1992	Helena (5)	Dawson County (Glendive) (3)	Jefferson (Boulder) (2)	Denton
1991	Helena (4)	Laurel (4)	Cut Bank (2)	Absarokee
1990	Great Falls (13)	Havre (7)	Cut Bank	Belfry
1989	Great Falls (12)	Havre (6)	Huntley Project (Worden)	Hot Springs (2)
1988	Billings Skyview	Custer County (Miles City) (7)	Cascade (5)	Hot Springs
1987	Billings West (6)	Dawson County (Glendive) (2)	Fort Benton (2)	Bridger
1986	Billings West (5)	Dawson County (Glendive)	Fort Benton	Sheridan (6)
1985	Billings West (4)	Custer County (Miles City) (6)	Bigfork	Sheridan (5)
1984	Billings West (3)	Custer County (Miles City) (5)	Cascade (4)	Sheridan (4)
1983	Billings Senior (4)	Park (Livingston) (2)	Cascade (3)	Dutton (2)
1982	Butte (20)	Butte Central Catholic	Troy (3)	Dutton
1981	Butte (19)	Polson (7)	Shepherd (4)	Florence-Carlton
1980	Missoula Hellgate (27)	Laurel (3)	Jefferson (Boulder)	Stanford (2)
1979	Billings West (2)	Laurel (2)	Belgrade	Stanford
1978	Great Falls (11)	Laurel	Sweetgrass County (Big Timber)	White Sulphur Springs
1977	Great Falls (10)	Glasgow (7)	Corvallis	Columbus (2)
1976	Great Falls (9)	Glasgow (6)	Forsyth	Twin Bridges
1975	Butte (18)	Glasgow (5)	Three Forks	Frenchtown
1974	Butte (17)	Polson (6)	Cascade (2)	Shepherd (3)
1973	Billings West	Havre (5)	Plentywood (4)	Shepherd (2)
1972	Missoula Hellgate (26)	Havre (4)	Plentywood (3)	Charlo
1971	Missoula Hellgate (25)	Havre (3)	Plentywood (2)	Shepherd
1970	Great Falls (8)	Bozeman (8)	Plentywood	Outlook
1969	Billings Senior (3)	Havre (2)	Shelby (2)	Medicine Lake (4)
1968	Great Falls (7)	Bozeman (7)	Shelby	Broadview
1967	Great Falls (6)	Bozeman (6)	Conrad (2)	Medicine Lake (3)
1966	Butte (16)	Glasgow (4)	Conrad	Medicine Lake (2)
1965	Great Falls (5)	Glasgow (3)	Polson (5)	Granite County (Philipsburg)
1964	Missoula Hellgate (24)	Glasgow (2)	Polson (4)	Medicine Lake
1963	Butte (15)	Glasgow	Red Lodge (2)	Sheridan (3)
1962	Great Falls (4)	Custer County (Miles City) (4)	Red Lodge	Sheridan (2)
1961	Billings (2)	Custer County (Miles City) (3)	Loyola Sacred Heart (Missoula) (2)	Troy (2)
1960	Helena (3)	Hardin	Loyola Sacred Heart (Missoula)	Plains (2)
1959	Park (Livingston)	Sidney (3)	Hamilton (5)	Broadwater County (Townsend) (2)
1958	Missoula Hellgate (23)	Sidney (2)	Whitefish (2)	Troy
1957	Missoula Hellgate (22)	Sidney	Hamilton (4)	Cascade
1956	Missoula Hellgate (21)	Havre	Polson (3)	Broadwater County (Townsend)
1955	Missoula Hellgate (20)	Custer County (Miles City) (2)	Polson (2)	
1954	Missoula Hellgate (19)	Custer County (Miles City)	Whitefish	
1953		Missoula Hellgate (18)	Fairview	
1952		Helena (2)	Polson	
1951		Missoula Hellgate (17)	Hamilton (3)	
1950		Missoula Hellgate (16)	Hamilton (2)	
1949		Missoula Hellgate (15)	Victor	
1948		Billings	Hamilton	
1947		Missoula Hellgate (14)	Libby (2)	
1946		Missoula Hellgate (13)	Libby	
1945		Cancelled due to WWII.		
1944		Cancelled due to WWII.		
1943		Cancelled due to WWII.		
1942		Missoula Hellgate (12)	Columbus	
1941		Missoula Hellgate (11)	Lincoln County (Eureka)	
1940		Missoula Hellgate (10)	Plains	
1939		Missoula Hellgate (9)	Sheridan	
1938		Butte (14)		
1937		Butte (13)		
1936		Butte (12)		
1935		Butte (11)		
1934		Missoula Hellgate (8)		
1933		Butte (10)		
1932		Missoula Hellgate (7)		
1931		Butte (9)		
1930		Missoula Hellgate (6)		
1929		Great Falls (3)		
1928		Butte (8)		
1927		Butte (7)		
1926		Missoula Hellgate (5)		
1925		Butte (6)		
1924		Butte (5)		
1923		Great Falls (2)		
1922		Great Falls		
1921		Butte (4)		
1920		Butte (3)		
1919		Butte (2)		
1918		Stevensville		
1917		Cancelled due to flu epidemic.		
1916		Missoula Hellgate (4)		
1915		Missoula Hellgate (3)		
1914		Gallatin County (Bozeman) (5)		
1913		Gallatin County (Bozeman) (4)		
1912		Gallatin County (Bozeman) (3)		
1911		Gallatin County (Bozeman) (2)		
1910		Gallatin County (Bozeman)		
1909		Helena		
1908		Missoula Hellgate (2)		
1907		Flathead County (Kalispell)		
1906		Anaconda		
1905		Butte		
1904		Missoula Hellgate		

^{†} Co-Champions

=== Girls ===
Year	AA	A	B	C
2026	Billings West (8)	Havre (3)	Jefferson (Boulder)	Richy-Lambert (2)
2025	Gallatin (Bozeman)	Whitefish (6)	Loyola Sacred Heart (Missoula) (4)	Richy-Lambert
2024	Helena (4)	Corvallis (9)	Huntley Project (Worden) (5)	Roberts & Savage^{†}
2023	Helena (3)	Corvallis (8)	Loyola Sacred Heart (Missoula) (3)	Plentywood (2)
2022	Helena (2)	Whitefish (5)	Sweet Grass County (Big Timber) (2)	Plentywood
2021	Missoula Sentinel (3)	Laurel	Sweet Grass County (Big Timber)	Seeley-Swan (9)
2020	Cancelled due to COVID-19 pandemic.			
2019	Bozeman (5)	Whitefish (4)	Baker & Huntley Project (Worden) (4)^{†}	Seeley-Swan (8)
2018	Missoula Sentinel (2)	Beaverhead County (Dillon)	Bigfork (3)	Manhattan Christian (3)
2017	Missoula Sentinel	Belgrade (5)	Bigfork (2)	Fort Benton (4)
2016	Billings West (7)	Corvallis (7)	Malta (5)	Plains (4)
2015	Billings Senior (6)	Corvallis (6)	Plains (3)	West Yellowstone
2014	Billings Senior (5)	Corvallis (5)	Plains (2)	Seeley-Swan (7)
2013	Billings Senior (4)	Corvallis (4)	Plains	Superior
2012	Billings Senior (3)	Corvallis (3)	Loyola Sacred Heart (Missoula) (2)	North Star
2011	Billings Senior (2)	Corvallis (2)	Glasgow (3)	Fairview
2010	Billings Senior	Polson (4)	Cut Bank (3)	Ennis
2009	Butte (4)	Belgrade (4)	Choteau	Big Sandy (4)
2008	Missoula Big Sky (2)	Polson (3)	Glasgow (2)	Big Sandy (3)
2007	Bozeman (4)	Belgrade (3)	Huntley Project (Worden) (3)	Big Sandy (2)
2006	Billings West (6)	Belgrade (2)	Huntley Project (Worden) (2)	Big Sandy
2005	Flathead (Kalispell) (18)	Anaconda	Loyola Sacred Heart (Missoula)	Geraldine (3)
2004	Bozeman (3)	Polson (2)	Huntley Project (Worden)	Geraldine (2)
2003	Bozeman (2)	Polson	Conrad (3)	Geraldine
2002	Flathead (Kalispell) (17)	Belgrade	Conrad (2)	Harlowton (10)
2001	Bozeman	Custer County (Miles City) (8)	Florence-Carlton	Harlowton (9)
2000	Helena	Sidney (2)	Malta (4)	Harlowton (8)
1999	Flathead (Kalispell) (16)	Colstrip (3)	Malta (3)	Harlowton (7)
1998	Flathead (Kalispell) (15)	Colstrip (2)	Malta (2)	Harlowton (6)
1997	Helena Capital (2)	Colstrip	Fort Benton (3)	Absarokee (3)
1996	Helena Capital	Custer County (Miles City) (7)	Manhattan	Absarokee (2)
1995	Flathead (Kalispell) (14)	Billings Central Catholic (3)	Lincoln County (Eureka)	Cascade (5)
1994	Flathead (Kalispell) (13)	Billings Central Catholic (2)	Chinook	Sheridan
1993	Flathead (Kalispell) (12)	Billings Central Catholic	Troy	Belt (2)
1992	Flathead (Kalispell) (11)	Dawson County (Glendive)	Bigfork	Manhattan Christian (2)
1991	Flathead (Kalispell) (10)	Havre (2)	Frenchtown (3)	Bridger (2)
1990	Missoula Big Sky	Custer County (Miles City) (6) & Havre^{†}	Forsyth	Bridger
1989	Flathead (Kalispell) (9)	Park (Livingston) (2)	Cut Bank (2)	Hot Springs
1988	Flathead (Kalispell) (8)	Park (Livingston)	Cut Bank	Belt
1987	Butte (3)	Glasgow	Wolf Point (2)	Dutton (2)
1986	Butte (2)	Custer County (Miles City) (5)	Wolf Point	Seeley-Swan (6)
1985	Great Falls (2)	Custer County (Miles City) (4)	Conrad & Malta^{†}	Seeley-Swan (5)
1984	C.M. Russell (Great Falls) (3) & Butte^{†}	Whitefish (3)	Thompson Falls	Seeley-Swan (4)
1983	Great Falls	Butte Central Catholic (3)	Fort Benton (2)	Seeley-Swan (3)
1982	Billings West (5)	Butte Central Catholic (2)	Fort Benton	Absarokee
1981	C.M. Russell (Great Falls) (2)	Butte Central Catholic	Frenchtown (2)	Seeley-Swan (2)
1980	C.M. Russell (Great Falls)	Custer County (Miles City) (3)	Harlowton (5)	Arlee (4)
1979	Flathead (Kalispell) (7)	Hamilton (2)	Harlowton (4)	Arlee (3)
1978	Flathead (Kalispell) (6)	Hamilton	Harlowton (3)	Arlee (2)
1977	Flathead (Kalispell) (5)	Custer County (Miles City) (2)	Harlowton (2)	Arlee
1976	Billings West (4)	Custer County (Miles City)	Cascade (4)	Philipsburg
1975	Billings West (3)	Fergus (Lewistown)	Harlowton	Philipsburg
1974	Billings West (2)	Sidney	Corvallis	Frenchtown
1973	Flathead (Kalispell) (4)	Whitefish (2)	Seeley-Swan	Dutton
1972	Billings West	Whitefish	Ronan	Manhattan Christian
1971		Flathead (Kalispell) (3)	Cascade (3)	
1970		Flathead (Kalispell) (2)	Cascade (2)	
1969		Flathead (Kalispell)	Cascade	

^{†} Co-Champions

== Volleyball MHSA State Champions ==
Year	AA	A	B	C
2026	C.M. Russell (Great Falls) (4)	Polson	Huntley Project (Worden) (17)	Circle (5)
2025	Gallatin (Bozeman) (2)	Billings Central Catholic (10)	Shepherd	Circle (4)
2024	Gallatin (Bozeman)	Billings Central Catholic (9)	Huntley Project (Worden) (16)	Circle (3)
2023	Billings West (3)	Hardin (6)	Huntley Project (Worden) (15)	Manhattan Christian (5)
2022	Billings Senior (13)	Billings Central Catholic (8)	Huntley Project (Worden) (14)	Manhattan Christian (4)
2021	C.M. Russell (Great Falls) (3)	Billings Central Catholic (7)	Huntley Project (Worden) (13)	Manhattan Christian (3)
2020	Helena Capital (5)	Billings Central Catholic (6)	Joliet	Bridger (11)
2019	Helena Capital (4)	Corvallis (2)	Huntley Project (Worden) (12)	Manhattan Christian (2)
2018	Helena Capital (3)	Billings Central Catholic (5)	Huntley Project (Worden) (11)	Belt (2)
2017	Missoula Sentinel (6)	Billings Central Catholic (4)	Huntley Project (Worden) (10)	Ennis (2)
2016	Missoula Sentinel (5)	Columbia Falls (3)	Red Lodge (2)	Belt
2015	Bozeman	Columbia Falls (2)	Red Lodge	Circle (2)
2014	Billings Senior (12)	Belgrade (3)	Forsyth	Gardiner (3)
2013	Billings Senior (11)	Corvallis	Huntley Project (Worden) (9)	Gardiner (2)
2012	Billings Senior (10)	Laurel	Huntley Project (Worden) (8)	Gardiner
2011	Helena (2)	Fergus (Lewistown) (5)	Huntley Project (Worden) (7)	Manhattan Christian
2010	Helena	Fergus (Lewistown) (4)	Huntley Project (Worden) (6)	Terry (3)
2009	Billings West (2)	Billings Central Catholic (3)	Huntley Project (Worden) (5)	Ennis
2008	Billings Senior (9)	Fergus (Lewistown) (3)	Broadwater (Townsend)	Highwood
2007	Billings Senior (8)	Fergus (Lewistown) (2)	Huntley Project (Worden) (4)	Circle
2006	Billings Senior (7)	Whitefish (6)	Huntley Project (Worden) (3)	Simms
2005	Billings Senior (6)	Whitefish (5)	Loyola Sacred Heart (Missoula)	Chinook
2004	Billings West	Whitefish (4)	Huntley Project (Worden) (2)	Bridger (10)
2003	Billings Senior (5)	Fergus (Lewistown)	Huntley Project (Worden)	Bridger (9)
2002 (Fall)*	Helena Capital (2)	Whitefish (3)	Roundup (5)	Bridger (8)
2002 (Winter)*	Billings Senior (4)	Hardin (5)	Roundup (4)	Harlowton (2)
2001	Flathead (Kalispell)	Whitefish (2)	Roundup/Lavina (3)	Harlowton
2000	C.M. Russell (Great Falls) (2)	Hardin (4)	Roundup (2)	Richey
1999	C.M. Russell (Great Falls)	Havre (3)	Manhattan	Bridger (7)
1998	Helena Capital	Havre (2)	Roundup	Bridger (6)
1997	Billings Senior (3)	Libby	Glasgow (2)	Bridger (5)
1996	Billings Skyview	Columbia Falls	Glasgow	Bridger (4)
1995	Missoula Big Sky (4)	Hardin (3)	Choteau (4)	Bridger (3)
1994	Butte	Hardin (2)	Troy (2)	Stanford
1993	Missoula Hellgate	Hardin	Troy	Superior
1992	Billings Senior (2)	Havre	Choteau (3)	Chester
1991	Billings Senior	Belgrade (2)	Choteau (2)	Bridger (2)
1990	Missoula Big Sky (3)	Park (Livingston) (2)	Choteau	Bridger
1989	Missoula Big Sky (2)	Park (Livingston)	Three Forks (2)	Terry (2)
1988	Missoula Sentinel (4)	Billings Central Catholic (2)	Shelby	Terry
1987	Missoula Sentinel (3)	Billings Central Catholic	Three Forks	Twin Bridges (2)
1986	Missoula Sentinel (2)	Whitefish	Bigfork	
1985	Missoula Sentinel		Twin Bridges	
1984	Missoula Big Sky		Belgrade	

^{*} Beginning in the 2002-03 school year, girls volleyball switched seasons from winter to fall. Thus there were two girls volleyball champions crowned in the 2002 calendar year per class, one for each separate school year. This coincided with girls basketball switching seasons from fall to winter.

== Wrestling MHSA State Champions ==
=== Boys ===
Year	AA	A	B	C
2026	Billings West (6)	Sidney/Fairview (14)	Huntley Project (Worden) (10)	Circle (7)
2025	Billings West (5)	Laurel (6)	Huntley Project (Worden) (9)	Circle (6)
2024	Billings West (4)	Laurel (5)	Huntley Project (Worden) (8)	Forsyth (5)
2023	Billings West (3)	Columbia Falls (4)	Huntley Project (Worden) (7)	Superior (4)
2022	Flathead (Kalispell) (11)	Sidney/Fairview (13)	Huntley Project (Worden) (6)	Circle (5)
2021	Flathead (Kalispell) (10)	Sidney/Fairview (12)	Glasgow (14)	Circle (4)
2020	Great Falls (8)	Sidney/Fairview (11)	Glasgow (13)	Circle (3)
2019	Bozeman (6)	Sidney/Fairview (10)	Colstrip (5)	Circle (2)
2018	Flathead (Kalispell) (9)	Sidney/Fairview (9)	Colstrip (4)	Circle
2017	Flathead (Kalispell) (8)	Havre (14)	Lincoln County (Eureka)	Cascade
2016	Billings Senior (2)	Havre (13)	Colstrip (3)	Chinook (9)
2015	Great Falls (7)	Havre (12)	Choteau (3)	Chinook (8)
2014	Great Falls (6)	Havre (11)	Colstrip (2)	Belt
2013	Great Falls (5)	Havre (10)	Forsyth (4)	Fort Benton
2012	Glacier (Kalispell)	Corvallis (3)	Forsyth (3)	Chinook (7)
2011	Bozeman (5)	Laurel (4)	Forsyth (2)	Chinook (6)
2010	Flathead (Kalispell) (7)	Havre (9)	Glasgow (12)	Chinook (5)
2009	Flathead (Kalispell) (6)	Havre (8)	Glasgow (11)	Chinook (4)
2008	Flathead (Kalispell) (5)	Havre (7)	Glasgow (10)	Arlee (2)
2007	Flathead (Kalispell) (4)	Havre (6)	Glasgow (9)	Chinook (3)
2006	Flathead (Kalispell) (3)	Sidney (8)	Conrad (8)	
2005	Billings Skyview (6)	Sidney (7)	Conrad (7)	
2004	Flathead (Kalispell) (2)	Sidney (6)	Conrad (6)	
2003	Butte (17)	Sidney (5)	Conrad (5)	
2002	Billings Skyview (5)	Corvallis (2)	Glasgow (8)	
2001	Billings Skyview (4)	Havre (5)	Glasgow (7)	
2000	Butte (16)	Sidney (4)	Huntley Project (Worden) (5)	
1999	Great Falls (4)	Havre (4)	Conrad (4)	
1998	Billings Skyview (3)	Laurel (3)	Conrad (3)	
1997	Butte (15)	Havre (3)	Conrad (2)	
1996	Billings Skyview (2)	Polson (2)	Corvallis	
1995	Butte (14)	Polson	Conrad	
1994	Billings West (2)	Colstrip	Superior (3)	
1993	Billings Skyview	Sidney (3)	Glasgow (6)	
1992	Butte (13)	Sidney (2)	Forsyth	
1991	Butte (12)	Columbia Falls (3)	Choteau (2)	
1990	Butte (11)	Columbia Falls (2)	Choteau	
1989	Butte (10)	Sidney	Huntley Project (Worden) (4)	
1988	Butte (9)	Libby (2)	Huntley Project (Worden) (3)	
1987	Butte (8)	Libby	Huntley Project (Worden) (2)	
1986	Butte (7)	Custer County (Miles City) (7)	Huntley Project (Worden)	
1985	Butte (6)	Custer County (Miles City) (6) & Laurel (2)^{†}	Chinook (2)	
1984	Butte (5)	Custer County (Miles City) (5)	Cut Bank (5)	
1983	Butte (4)	Butte Central Catholic	Cut Bank (4)	
1982	Butte (3)	Ronan (8)	Arlee	
1981	Butte (2)	Ronan (7)	Chinook	
1980	Butte	Ronan (6)	Thompson Falls (2)	
1979	C.M. Russell (Great Falls) (5)	Ronan (5)	Thompson Falls	
1978	Missoula Hellgate (8)	Ronan (4)	Superior (2)	
1977	C.M. Russell (Great Falls) (4)	Glasgow (5)	Seeley-Swan	
1976	C.M. Russell (Great Falls) (3)	Ronan (3)	Superior	
1975	C.M. Russell (Great Falls) (2)	Columbia Falls	Chester (2)	
1974	Billings West	Ronan (2)	Chester	
1973	Flathead (Kalispell)	Glasgow (4)	Ronan	
1972	Great Falls (3)	Bozeman (4)	Cut Bank (3)	
1971	C.M. Russell (Great Falls)	Bozeman (3)	Cut Bank (2)	
1970	Great Falls (2)	Havre (2)	Cut Bank	
1969	Missoula Sentinel (5)	Havre	Baker (2) & Big Sandy (2) & Malta (4)^{†}	
1968	Missoula Sentinel (4)	Bozeman (2)	Baker	
1967	Missoula Sentinel (3)	Laurel	Big Sandy	
1966	Missoula Sentinel (2)	Glasgow (3)	Malta (3)	
1965	Missoula Sentinel	Billings Central Catholic	Malta (2)	
1964	Missoula Hellgate (7)	Glasgow (2)	Malta	
1963	Missoula Hellgate (6)	Glasgow		
1962	Missoula Hellgate (5)	Bozeman		
1961	Missoula Hellgate (4)	Custer County (Miles City) (4)		
1960	Missoula Hellgate (3)	Custer County (Miles City) (3)		
1959	Great Falls	Custer County (Miles City) (2)		
1958	Missoula Hellgate (2)	Custer County (Miles City)		
1957	Missoula Hellgate			
1956	Billings			

^{†} Co-Champions

=== Girls ===
Year	AA	A	B	C
2026	Billings Senior (4)	Custer County (Miles City) (2)	Fort Benton	Simms (2)
2025	Billings Senior (3)	Custer County (Miles City)	Baker (2)	Simms
2024	Billings Senior (2)	Ronan (2)	Baker	
2023	Billings Senior	Ronan		
2022	Flathead (Kalispell) (2)			
2021	Flathead (Kalispell)			
