= FBHS =

FBHS may refer to:

- Fellow of the British Horse Society, a riding instructor qualification
- Fortune Brands Home & Security, a fixture and hardware manufacturer

== Schools ==
- Flowery Branch High School, Flowery Branch, Georgia, United States
- Flour Bluff High School, Corpus Christi, Texas, United States
- Forest Brook High School, Houston, Texas, United States
- Fort Benton High School, Fort Benton, Montana, United States
- Fort Bragg High School, Fort Bragg, California, United States

== See also ==
- FBH (disambiguation)
