= Corvallis =

Corvallis may refer to:

== Places ==
- Corvallis, Montana, USA
- Corvallis, Oregon, USA

== Education ==
- Corvallis High School (California)
- Corvallis High School (Montana)
- Corvallis High School (Oregon)

== Others ==
- Cessna 350 Corvalis light aircraft
- Cessna 400 Corvalis light aircraft
- Corvallis Gazette-Times
- Corvallis Knights, baseball team
- Corvallis Municipal Airport
- Corvallis Pride, women's football team
