= Chinook High School =

Chinook High School may refer to one of the following:

- Chinook High School (Alberta)
- Chinook High School (Montana)
