= Doug Brown (runner, born 1944) =

American runner (born 1944)

Personal information
- Nationality: USA
- Born: May 31, 1944 (age 82)
- Education: Red Lodge High School; University of Montana

Sport
- Sport: Sport of athletics
- Events: 5000 metres 10,000 metres
- College team: Montana Grizzlies

Achievements and titles
- National finals: 1964 NCAAs; • 10,000m, 2nd (silver); • 5000m, 6th; 1965 NCAAs; • 6 miles, 1st (gold); • 3 miles, 1st (gold); 1966 USA 15K; • 15K, 1st (gold)
- Personal bests: 5000 m: 14:09.6 (1965); 10,000 m: 29:33.6 (1965)
- Updated on 20 February 2024

Doug Brown (born May 31, 1944) is an American long-distance runner. He won the 6-mile run and 3-mile run (imperial equivalents of the 10,000 metres and 5000 metres) at the 1965 NCAA Division I Outdoor Track and Field Championships, setting championship records in both events. He has been called Montana's greatest distance runner ever.

== Career ==
Brown won his first ever race, a half-mile run as a child in the 7th grade. He ran 2:21 for the half-mile as an 8th-grader, and the following year at Red Lodge High School he broke the school record in the mile run with a 4:42 time as a freshman.

In 1965, Brown won two titles at the 1965 NCAA Division I Outdoor Track and Field Championships, competing for the Montana Grizzlies track and field team. Running with a "full-throttle" strategy, he set meeting records in the 6-mile run and 3-mile run.

Brown won the U.S. 15K championship title in 1966 with a time of 45:11.0. It was the only time the championship was held on a running track.

== Personal life ==
Brown was originally from Carbon County, Montana, where he attended Red Lodge High School. He later moved to Missoula, Montana, and became a track and field coach at Sentinel High School.
