= Shelby High School =

Shelby High School is the name of several high schools in the United States:

- Shelby High School (Michigan), in Shelby, Oceana County, Michigan
- Shelby High School (Montana), in Shelby, Montana
- Shelby High School (Nebraska), in Shelby, Nebraska
- Shelby High School (North Carolina), in Shelby, North Carolina
- Shelby High School (Ohio), in Shelby, Ohio
