= Patrick O'Connell (American football) =

American football player (born 1998)

No. 52 – Seattle Seahawks
- Position: Middle linebacker
- Roster status: Active

Personal information
- Born: December 31, 1998 (age 27); Kalispell, Montana, U.S.
- Listed height: 6 ft 1 in (1.85 m)
- Listed weight: 231 lb (105 kg)

Career information
- High school: Glacier (MT)
- College: Mary (2017); Montana (2018–2022)
- NFL draft: 2023: undrafted

Career history
- Seattle Seahawks (2023–present)

Awards and highlights
- Super Bowl champion (LX)

Career NFL statistics as of 2025
- Total tackles: 22
- Stats at Pro Football Reference

Patrick O'Connell (born December 31, 1998) is an American professional football middle linebacker for the Seattle Seahawks of the National Football League (NFL). He played college football for the Montana Grizzlies and was signed by the team as an undrafted free agent in 2023.

== Early life ==
O'Connell was born on December 31, 1998, in Kalispell, Montana. He grew up focusing on playing baseball. He attended Glacier High School, and played football, basketball and baseball: he was baseball team captain for three years, and also captained the football and basketball teams in his senior year. He helped his teams reach five state championships in his tenure at Glacier, including winning the state football title in 2014 and the basketball title in 2017.

O'Connell was a first-team all-conference selection in baseball in his last two years, and also was a one-time first-team all-state selection in the sport, additionally receiving second-team all-conference football honors as a junior and first-team as a senior, as well as being first-team all-state in football on both offense and defense in his senior year. A linebacker and fullback, O'Connell was named the state football defensive most valuable player in 2016 while having 135 tackles, 18 tackles for loss (TFLs), four sacks and two interceptions. He played in the Montana East West Shrine All-Star Game and in the Montana–North Dakota All-Star Game. He committed to play college football and college baseball for the Mary Marauders.

== College career ==
O'Connell appeared in 10 games for the Marauders football team in 2017, recording 33 tackles and 3.5 tackles-for-loss while also having a defensive touchdown. He left Mary, and gave up his athletic scholarship and baseball career in 2018 to join the Montana Grizzlies football team as a walk-on. He redshirted his first season at Montana and was named the defensive scout team player of the year. He moved his way up the depth chart, and midway through the 2019 season, became a starter for Montana at linebacker. O'Connell had eight starts in 14 games for the 2019 Montana Grizzlies, and had 56 tackles, a team-leading 6.5 sacks and 7.5 tackles-for-loss.

O'Connell appeared in two games during the COVID-19-shortened 2020 season. As a junior in 2021, he broke out, and became a top NCAA Division I Football Championship Subdivision (FCS) player, recording 105 tackles, 22 tackles-for-loss and 14 sacks while being named first-team All-Big Sky Conference and first-team All-American, additionally finishing third in voting for the Buck Buchanan Award, given to the best defensive player in the FCS. He returned for a final season in 2022 after being given extra eligibility due to the COVID-19 pandemic. That year, he missed three games from injury, but managed to still be a first-team All-Big Sky player with a conference-leading eight sacks and 14 tackles-for-loss, along with 73 tackles. O'Connell ended his stint at Montana being fourth all-time in school history for tackles for loss, and placed sixth in sacks; he was invited to the Hula Bowl to conclude his collegiate career.

== Professional career ==
Pre-draft measurables
Height	Weight	Arm length	Hand span	Wingspan	40-yard dash	10-yard split	20-yard split	20-yard shuttle	Three-cone drill	Vertical jump	Broad jump
6 ft 1 1/8 in (1.86 m)	227 lb (103 kg)	31 7/8 in (0.81 m)	9 1/2 in (0.24 m)	6 ft 5 7/8 in (1.98 m)	4.70 s	1.63 s	2.75 s	4.28 s	6.97 s	38.5 in (0.98 m)	10 ft 2 in (3.10 m)
All values from Pro Day

After going unselected in the 2023 NFL draft, O'Connell was signed by the Seattle Seahawks as an undrafted free agent. He was second on the team in preseason for tackles with 17, but was released at the final roster cuts, subsequently being re-signed to the practice squad. He was elevated to the active roster for the team's Week 14 game against the San Francisco 49ers but was inactive for the game. He was signed to the team's active roster on December 30, 2023. He made his NFL debut the following day, on his 25th birthday, recording a tackle. It was the only game he played in the season.

O'Connell was waived by the Seahawks on August 27, 2024, and re-signed to the practice squad. He was promoted to the active roster on November 27.

On August 26, 2025, O'Connell was waived by the Seahawks as part of final roster cuts and re-signed to the practice squad the next day. He was promoted to the active roster on November 26. He played in Super Bowl LX, a 29–13 win by the Seattle Seahawks over the New England Patriots. He had one tackle in the game.
