= Corvallis High School =

Corvallis High School may refer to:

- Corvallis High School (California)
- Corvallis High School (Montana)
- Corvallis High School (Oregon)
