= Duane Rilla =

American football coach (1964–2001)

Biographical details
- Born: April 14, 1964; Glendive, Montana, U.S.
- Died: February 25, 2001 (aged 36); Dillon, Montana, U.S.
- Education: North Dakota State College of Science (A.A. 1984); Northern State University (B.S.Ed. 1991; M.A.Ed. 1992)

Coaching career (HC unless noted)
- 1992: Mount Baker HS (WA)
- 1993–1994: Northern State (OC/OL)
- 1995–1998: Issaquah HS (WA)
- 1999–2000: Western Montana

Head coaching record
- Overall: 2–17 (college)

Duane Joseph Rilla (April 14, 1964 – February 25, 2001) was an American football coach. He served as the head football coach at Western Montana College—now known as University of Montana Western—from 1999 to 2000.

== Early life and education ==
Rilla was born in Glendive, Montana. He attended Dawson County High School, where he was active in multiple sports before graduating in 1982. He went on to attend North Dakota State College of Science, earning a degree in petroleum technology in 1984.

Rilla later attended Northern State University in Aberdeen, South Dakota, where he assisted with football coaching while completing his academic studies. He earned a bachelor's degree in business education in 1991 and a master's degree in education in 1992.

== Coaching career ==
=== High school coaching ===
After completing his graduate education, Rilla moved to Washington in 1992, where he coached football at Mount Baker High School for one season. In 1995, he returned to Washington and became head football coach at Issaquah High School, leading the program for three seasons.

=== Northern State ===
In 1993, Rilla returned to Aberdeen, where he served as offensive coordinator and offensive line coach for Northern State Wolves.

=== Western Montana ===
In 1998, Rilla moved to Dillon, Montana, and was named head football coach at Western Montana College—now known as University of Montana Western—. He led the Bulldogs for two seasons.

During the 1999 season, Western Montana finished with a 1–8 overall record and a 1–7 mark in conference play. The following season, in 2000, the Bulldogs finished 1–9 overall and 1–7 in conference competition.

== Death ==
Rilla died on February 25, 2001, at his home in Dillon, following a battle with cancer. He was 36 years old.

== Head coaching record ==
=== College ===
Year	Team	Overall	Conference	Standing	Bowl/playoffs
Western Montana Bulldogs (Frontier Conference) (1999–2000)
1999	Western Montana	1–8	1–7	5th	
2000	Western Montana	1–9	1–7	5th	
Montana Western:		2–17	2–14		
Total:		2–17			
