= Thompson Falls High School =

School in Sanders County, Montana, US

Location
- 601 Golf St; Thompson Falls, Sanders County, Montana 59873; United States; 47°35′43″N 115°19′19″W

Information
- School district: Thompson Falls Public Schools
- Superintendent: Bud Scully
- Principal: Dan Schrock
- Teaching staff: 12.25 (FTE)
- Enrollment: 185 (2023–2024)
- Student to teacher ratio: 15.10
- Color
- Slogan: "It's a great day to be a BlueHawk"
- Mascot: Bluehawk
- Website: www.thompsonfalls.net

Thompson Falls High School is a high school in Thompson Falls, Montana, United States. As of the 2014–2015 school year, it had an enrollment of 175 students in grades 9–12.

The school has an unusually large percentage of students who have come from other states, where they have had difficulties and have been sent to Sanders County to live in group homes. More than 90% of these students go on to graduate from high school. In 2015 the school received a College and Career Transition Award from ACT and the state of Montana.
