= Big Sandy High School (Montana) =

Public secondary school in Big Sandy, Chouteau County, Montana

Location
- 398 First Avenue; Big Sandy, Montana 69620; United States; 48°10′46″N 110°6′59″W

Information
- NCES District ID: 3003750
- CEEB code: 270070
- NCES School ID: 300375000054
- Staff: 7.33 (FTE)
- Grades: 9-12
- Enrollment: 54 (2023–2024)
- Student to teacher ratio: 7.37
- Colors: Purple and gold
- Team name: Pioneers
- Feeder schools: F.E. Miley Elementary School; Warrick Elementary School
- Website: www.bigsandy.k12.mt.us

Big Sandy High School is a small public secondary school in Big Sandy, Chouteau County, Montana. They are known as the Pioneers.
