= Hot Springs High School (Montana) =

Location
- 325 Broadway; Hot Springs, Montana 59845; United States; 47.609°N 114.666°W

Information
- Type: Public High School
- School district: Self-administered
- Superintendent: Mike Perry
- Principal: Kelly Moore
- Teaching staff: 6.24 (FTE)
- Grades: 9 to 12
- Gender: coed
- Enrollment: 61 (2023–2024)
- Student to teacher ratio: 8.17
- Campus type: rural
- Color
- Team name: Savage Heat
- Website: www.hssdmt.org

Hot Springs High School is a public secondary school in Hot Springs, Montana. Hot Springs High School is self-administered.

The school, which serves students in grades 9-12, had an enrollment of 74 students as of 2003–2004, according to CCD data and an 11.6 student to teacher ratio. The school's student body for that year was 58% Caucasian, 34% Native American, 5% Asian, and 3% African American.

The school is outside a CBSA and thus classified rural by the United States Census Bureau.

== Mascot ==
HSHS's team mascot is "Savage Heat." For many years, the mascot was simply "Savages," but in the wake of a 2000 Tribal Council Resolution denouncing the use of Native Americans as mascots, the Hot Springs school board agreed in 2007 to rename the team.
