= Great Falls Central Catholic High School =

- Great Falls, Cascade County, Montana; United States

Information
- Type: Private, Coeducational
- Religious affiliation: Roman Catholic
- Colors: Navy Blue and Gold
- Slogan: Developing Christ-Centered Leaders For Life
- Fight song: "On Wisconsin"
- Athletics conference: Class “C”
- Mascot: Mustang
- Nickname: Mustangs
- Accreditation: National Catholic Educational Association

Great Falls Central Catholic High School, later merged into St. Patrick's Academy High School along with Holy Spirit Catholic School and Our Lady of Lourdes, was a private, Roman Catholic high school in Great Falls, Montana. It was one of three Catholic high schools in the Roman Catholic Diocese of Great Falls-Billings. Following the closure of Holy Spirit Catholic School (Saint Patrick's Academy East) parents and students became unsure of the longevity of the school causing many to transfer to Great Falls High School or Charles M. Russell High School.

== Background ==
Great Falls Central Catholic High School (later merged into St. Patrick's Academy High School in the spring of 2025) was originally established in 1951 from a merger of St. Mary's High School, the Ursuline Academy for Girls and St. Thomas Home boarding school. It closed in 1973 and the building was sold to the Great Falls Public Schools. The school was reestablished at the University of Great Falls in 2001. It moved to its final location when it was built in 2008. In August 2026, four days before the first day of school, it was announced by the school that it would not be opened for the first day and that it would be closed until further notice due to the Diocese of Great Falls–Billings failing to find a principal and qualified faculty, causing all of the student body, 19 remaining students to have to transfer to public high schools. Although it is rumored among previous students and faculty that what really caused it to close was the lack of students and lack of money but these claims are not confirmable as the Diocese of Great Falls–Billings have not commented.

== Alumni ==
- Kathleen Galvin-Halcro, former member of the Montana House of Representatives (1998–2006)

== Notes and references ==
McGonigal, Tim (August 24th, 2026). "Catholic Diocese cancels St. Patrick's Academy opening days before new school year". KRTV.
