= Gardiner High School (Montana) =

Location
- 510 Stone Street; Gardiner, Montana 59030; United States
- Coordinates: 45°01′53″N 110°42′40″W

Information
- Type: Public high school
- School district: Gardiner Public Schools
- NCES School ID: 301185000322
- Principal: Mike Baer
- Teaching staff: 4.52 (on an FTE basis)
- Grades: 9–12
- Enrollment: 48 (2023-2024)
- Student to teacher ratio: 10.62
- Colors: Royal blue and gold
- Nickname: Bruins
- Website: www.gardiner.org

Gardiner High School is a public high school in Gardiner, Montana, United States. It is part of the Gardiner Public Schools district.

All Gardiner schools students attend school in the same building. It is located on the former grounds of the Northern Pacific Railway Gardiner station.
