= Bigfork High School =

Public high school in Montana

Coordinates: 48.064°N 114.076°W

Location
- 600 Commerce Street; Bigfork, (Flathead County), Montana 59911; United States

Information
- Type: Public high school
- Principal: Mark Hansen
- Staff: 22.90 (FTE)
- Enrollment: 352 (2023-2024)
- Student to teacher ratio: 15.37
- Colors: Royal blue, scarlet and white
- Mascot: Viking and Valkyries
- Nickname: Vikings/Valkyries

Bigfork High School, part of Bigfork School District, is located in Bigfork, Montana. They are known as the Vikings and Valkyries.
