= Superior High School (Montana) =

Location
- 410 Arizona Avenue; Superior, Montana 59872; United States of America; 47°11′20″N 114°52′45″W

Information
- Type: Public
- Principal: Allan Labbe
- Staff: 10.55 (FTE)
- Grades: 9-12
- Enrollment: 103 (2023–2024)
- Student to teacher ratio: 9.76
- Colors: Red, white and blue
- Mascot: Bobcats
- Website: www.ssd3.us

Superior High School is a high school located in Superior, Montana and is part of Superior K-12 Schools. As of the 2006–2007 school year, Superior remains a class B high school. There is an elementary school and junior high school sharing the campus.
