= Huntley Project High School =

Public school in Worden, Montana, US

Location
- 1477 Ash Street; Worden, Montana; USA
- 45.96°N 108.165°W

Information
- Type: Public
- Established: Fall of 1968
- Superintendent: Mark Wandle
- Principal: Sam Bruner
- Staff: 17.28 (FTE)
- Grades: 9-12
- Enrollment: 218 (2023–2024)
- Student to teacher ratio: 12.62
- Campus: Rural
- Colors: Red, black and white
- Sports: Football, Volleyball, Boys' Basketball, Girls' Basketball, Wrestling, Track, Cross-Country, Softball, & Golf
- Mascot: Red Devils
- Website: huntley.k12.mt.us

Huntley Project High School is a high school in Worden, Montana. Home of the Red Devils, the Huntley Project School District serves students living in four small Montana communities: Worden, Ballantine, Huntley, and Pompey's Pillar, with total population nearing 3,000 people. It is located 20 miles (32 km) east of Montana's largest city, Billings, in the southeastern part of Montana.

On September 18, 2008, an early morning fire destroyed the high school building in Worden.

== About the school ==
Total 2006-2007 enrollment is 739 students, grades kindergarten through 12th grade. The high school currently has 226 students, making Huntley Project a Class B school in the Montana High School Association.

The name ‘Huntley Project’ is short for Huntley Irrigation Project, which was the second U.S. Bureau of Reclamation irrigation project. The area was part of the Crow Indian Reservation from 1874 to 1904 when the government purchased the 35,000 acres (140 km^{2}), stretching across 27 miles (43 km) from Huntley, east to the Little Bull Mountains.

Huntley Projects stated goals are for their students learn and develop citizenship.

The 36,208-square-foot (3,363.8 m^{2}) high school building was built in 1968 at a cost of $460,945. It was one of many schools designed by the firm Johnson-Graham & Associates.

== Athletics ==
Huntley Project Red Devils participate in Montana's Class B in the following athletic programs.

- Football
- Volleyball
- Cross Country
- Boys' Basketball
- Girls' Basketball
- Wrestling
- Boys' and Girls' Track
- Softball
- Golf

== Activities ==
Huntley Project students participate in the following extra-curricular clubs and activities.

- Student Council
- Cheerleading
- BPA
- FFA
- Pep Club
- National Honor Society
- Band, including pep band and concert band
- Choir
- Speech and Drama (State Championships: 2004, 2018)
- FCCLA
- Newspaper, the "Red and Black Attack," and Annual * HP News

== Awards ==
- In March 2022, a group of students was awarded the TechRise grant from NASA for their plan to research food cultivation in space.

== Notable alumni ==
- Dick Jones, Wyoming politician

== Fire ==
On September 18, 2008, an early morning fire destroyed the high school building in Worden. The fire destroyed nine classrooms, the home economics room, the library and computer lab, three offices, the high school gym and the band room. The concession stand, school trophies and other memorabilia were also destroyed.

Early reports said the fire was "suspicious" in nature. Yellowstone County deputies arrested four teens, all current or former Huntley Project students, in connection with the fire. Court records say that the four teens broke into the school, damaged several doors and vandalized the chemistry room and other rooms, broke into a vending machine for snacks and took footballs before leaving the building. Court records say the teens later returned to the school and set fires in the chemistry room and an office.

Gregory Dean Three Fingers, 18, was charged in Yellowstone County Justice Court with arson and burglary. He was arraigned on felony charges on September 26, 2008. Michael John Victoria II, 16, was charged as an adult in District Court with arson and burglary as well. He pleaded not guilty. Two younger teens, a boy and girl both aged 14, were cited in youth court in connection with the fire.

After the fire, students returned to classes in modular buildings moved onto the school campus, which were used, along with spare rooms in other buildings and around town, as classrooms until a new school was built. The school and campus were insured for more than $6 million. A new junior and high school were completed by 2011 for $13.5 million.
