= Hamilton High School (Montana) =

Public school in Montana, United States

Location
- 327 Fairgrounds Road; Hamilton, Ravalli County, Montana; 59840; United States
- Coordinates: 46°14′42″N 114°09′43″W

Information
- School type: High School
- Founded: 1909
- Superintendent: Tom Korst
- Principal: Ryan Wells
- Teaching staff: 36.66 (FTE)
- Grades: 9–12
- Enrollment: 555 (2023–2024)
- Student to teacher ratio: 15.14
- Colors: Cardinal and white
- Team name: Broncs
- Website: www.hsd3.org/o/hhs

Hamilton High School is located in the Bitterroot Valley in Hamilton, Montana, United States. As of the 2019–20 school year there were 474 students in grades 9–12 with a student to teacher ratio of 14.74 to 1. Graduating classes are generally around 125 students. The school mascot is the Bronc. Hamilton High School was rebuilt in the year 2000. The old Hamilton High School now serves as the Hamilton Middle School. The 700-seat Hamilton Performing Arts Center is located in Hamilton High School.

Hamilton High School classifies as a Class "A" school in the Montana High School Association. It is a member of the Southwestern "A" conference for most sports.
