= Moore High School (Montana) =

High school in Montana, United States

Location
- 509 Highland Avenue; Moore, Montana 59464; 46.9717°N 109.6929°W

Information
- Superintendent: Denise Chrest
- Teaching staff: 3.51 (FTE)
- Grades: 9-12
- Enrollment: 18 (2023–2024)
- Student to teacher ratio: 5.13
- Color
- Team name: Bulldogs
- Website: www.mooreschoolmt.com

Moore High School is a public high school located in Moore, Montana. It is the only high school in the Moore School District.
