= Alberton High School =

Location
- 306 Railroad Ave; Alberton, Mineral County 59820; United States
- Coordinates: 47°00′17″N 114°28′53″W

Information
- School type: Public, Secondary
- School district: Alberton K-12 Schools
- Superintendent: James Baldwin
- Staff: 4.40 (FTE)
- Grades: 9-12
- Enrollment: 36 (2023–2024)
- Student to teacher ratio: 8.18
- Campus: Suburb
- Colors: Maroon and White
- Mascot: Panther
- Website: alberton.k12.mt.us

Alberton High School is a high school located in Alberton, Montana and is part of Alberton K-12 Schools. In the 2006–2007 school year, there were 80 students enrolled. In the 2012–2013 school year, there were 45 students enrolled. There is a grade school sharing the campus that currently enrolls 108 students.
