= Beaverhead County High School =

Public high school in Dillon, Montana, USA

Location
- 104 North Pacific Street; Dillon, Montana 59725; 45°13′00″N 112°37′59″W

Information
- Type: Public high school
- Principal: Megan Conrow
- Staff: 21.78 (on an FTE basis)
- Grades: 9–12
- Enrollment: 336 (2023-2024)
- Student to teacher ratio: 15.43
- Colors: Blue and gold
- Nickname: Beavers
- Website: www.bchsmt.com

Beaverhead County High School is a high school in Dillon, Beaverhead County, Montana.

== Sports ==
The Dillon Beavers have been the Class "A" State Football Champions nine times since 2000. They have won the championship in 2000, 2003, 2005, 2006, 2011, 2013, 2014, 2016, and 2023. In 1990, 1999, 2007, 2009, 2012, 2016, 2017, 2024, and 2025 the Beavers won the Class "A" State Boys Basketball Championship. The Beavers also won state boys basketball titles in 1920 and 1946 before the current classification system had been created. In 1991, 1995, and 2003 the Beavers won the Class "A" State Girls Basketball Championship. In 2016 the Beavers won the Class "A" Boys Track Championship.

Also they won the boys 2006 State Cross Country State Champions for the first time ever. The girls volleyball and cross country received runner-up honors at state the same year. During the 2006–07 school year, Beaverhead County High School sports teams won three state championships, two runner-up trophies, and six divisional first-place trophies.

== See also ==
- List of high schools in Montana
