= Colstrip High School =

Public school in Montana, United States

Location
- 5000 Pine Butte Dr; Colstrip, Montana 59323; United States

Information
- Type: Public
- Established: 1924
- Principal: Robin Nansel
- Teaching staff: 15.50 (FTE)
- Grades: 9-12
- Enrollment: 157 (2023–2024)
- Student to teacher ratio: 10.13
- Colors: Kelly green, gold and black
- Sports: Football, Volleyball, Cross Country, Boys' Basketball, Girls' Basketball, Wrestling, Track and Field, Softball, and Golf
- Mascot: Colts
- Website: http://colstrippublicschools.org/

Colstrip High School (CHS) is the only high school in the city of Colstrip, Montana, located in the United States. It has one of the largest bus districts in the nation, including locations as far away as Ashland, Montana. Nestled in the foothills of Colstrip, the school contains an indoor pool, racquetball court, wrestling room, basketball gymnasium, weight lifting room and overlooks a public recreation area with baseball diamonds and golf course. It has lab spaces to support sciences, audiovisual technology, and the arts, including a theater. Established in 1924, the school provides opportunities, and has for 99 years as of March 2023.

== Academics ==
Academically, Colstrip hosts a number of advanced placement courses. In 2008, Colstrip High School had 243 enrolled students, and $1.54M in state funding.

== Athletics ==
Colstrip's mascots are the Colts and Fillies and the school uniforms are black, dark green and metallic gold. The Colts and Fillies play in the 3B conference with the Baker High School Spartans, Forsyth High School Dogies, Lame Deer High School Morningstars, St. Labre High School Braves, and Broadus High School Hawks.
