= FBH =

FBH may refer to:

- Ferdinand-Braun-Institut, a German research institute
- FBD Holdings, an Irish company
- Flat bottom hole - A type of reflector commonly used in reference standards. The end (bottom) surface of the hole is the reflector.
