= Fergus County High School =

- U.S. National Register of Historic Places
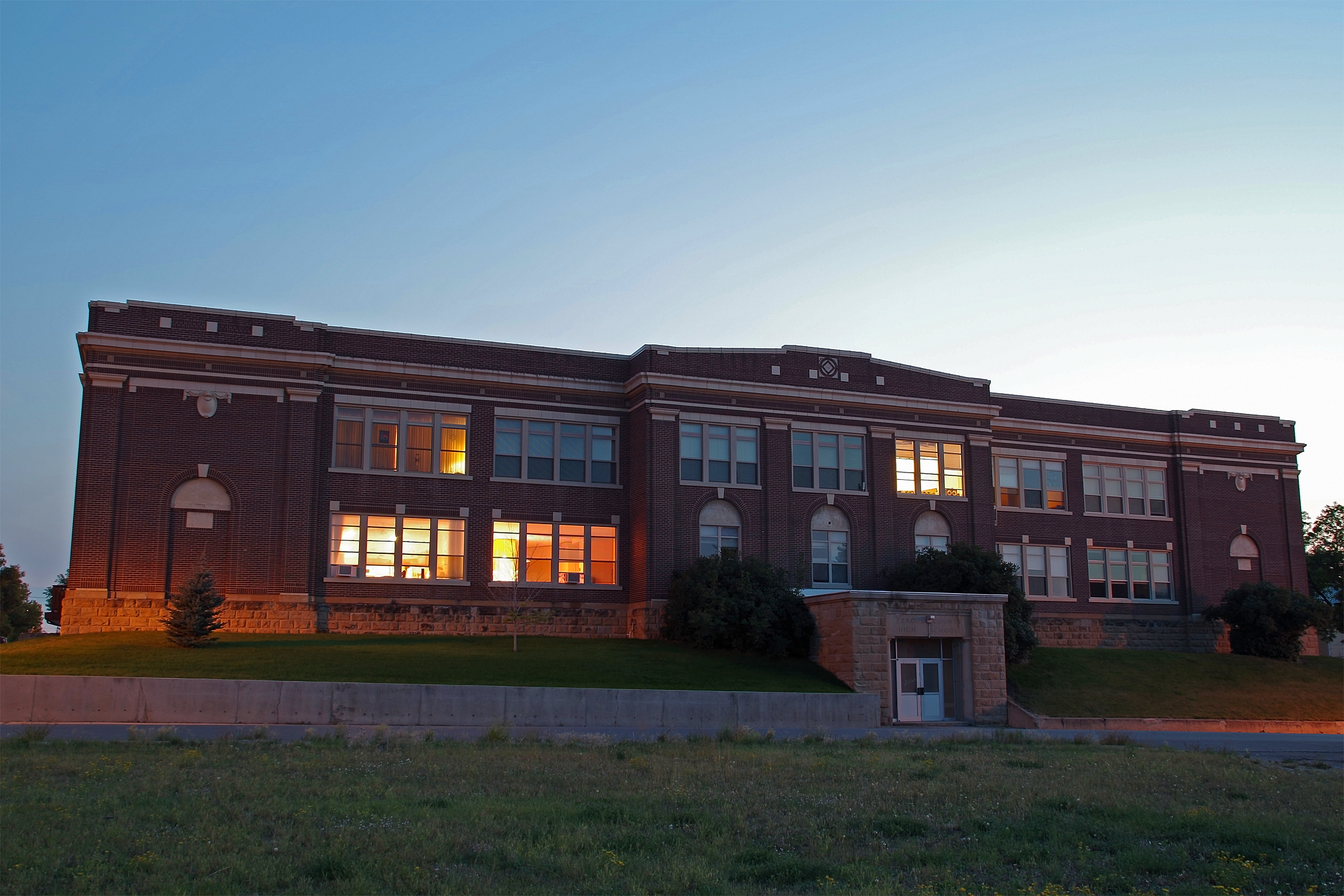

- Location within Montana Location within the United States
- Location: 412 6th Ave., S., Lewistown, Montana
- Coordinates: 47°3′37″N 109°25′33″W
- Area: less than one acre
- Built: 1919
- Architect: Multiple
- Architectural style: Renaissance, Beaux Arts
- MPS: Lewistown MRA
- NRHP reference No.: 85001409
- Added to NRHP: June 27, 1985

The Fergus County High School, located at 412 6th Ave., S., in Lewistown, Montana, was built in 1919 and expanded at later dates. It was listed on the National Register of Historic Places in 1985.

It includes Renaissance Revival and Beaux Arts architecture.

Its first two units were designed by architect J.G. Link.

The building is also known as Old Fergus High School.

The current high school in the area is the Fergus High School.

== 1986 school shooting ==
On December 4, 1986, 14-year-old Kristofer Hans intended to shoot his French teacher at Fergus High School, for a failing grade. Instead, Henrietta Smith, who was substituting for LaVonne Simonfy, was shot in the face and died. Hans fired several other shots as he fled, wounding vice principal John Moffatt, and two students. He then ran about a mile to his home, where he was arrested after the police surrounded his house. A classmate said Hans had repeatedly threatened to kill Ms. Simonfy, saying, "I'm going to blow Simonfy's head off." He was charged as an adult, convicted and sentenced to 206 years in prison. However he was paroled in 2015 and now lives in Nebraska as of February 2018.

== Bibliography ==
- Crews, Gordon A. (2016). Critical Examinations of School Violence and Disturbance in K-12 Education. Hershey, Pennsylvania: Information Science Reference. ISBN 978-1-4666-9935-9.
- Klein, Jessie (2013). The Bully Society: School Shootings and the Crisis of Bullying in America's Schools (reprint ed.). New York, New York: New York University Press. ISBN 978-0-8147-6371-1.
