= Laurel High School (Montana) =

Coordinates: 45°40′38″N 108°46′12″W

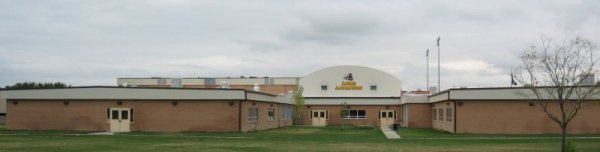
- Laurel Locomotives

Location
- 203 East 8th Street; Laurel Montana; Laurel, (Yellowstone County), Montana 59044; United States

Information
- Type: Public
- Status: Active
- School district: 7-70
- Teaching staff: 40.10 (FTE)
- Grades: 9–12
- Student to teacher ratio: 15.19
- Colors: Black, white, purple and gold
- Athletics: Class A
- Athletics conference: Eastern A
- Mascot: Locomotive
- Team name: Locomotives
- Accreditation: Northwest Association of Accredited Schools
- Website: lhs.laurel.k12.mt.us

Laurel High School is a high school in Laurel, Montana. It is the only high school in Laurel. Laurel is a class A school.

== Montana High School Association State Championships (47) ==
Information is from the Montana High School Association.

- Boys Basketball – 1969, 1972, 2010, 2015
- Boys Football – 1999, 2002, 2020
- Boys Golf – 1974, 1976, 1979, 1980, 1982, 1997, 1998, 1999, 2017, 2018, 2019, 2021, 2022, 2024
- Boys Track & Field 1978, 1979, 1980, 1991, 2019
- Boys Wrestling – 1967, 1985, 1998, 2011, 2024
- Girls Basketball – 2006, 2013
- Girls Cross Country – 1993
- Girls Golf – 2006, 2018, 2019. 2020, 2021
- Girls Softball – 1971, 2006
- Girls Volleyball – 2012
- Girls Soccer – 2014, 2017, 2019, 2020, 2021
