= Valley Christian School (Montana) =

Location
- 2526 Sunset Lane; Missoula, Montana 59808; United States; 46°51′29″N 114°02′27″W

Information
- Type: Private, Christian
- Religious affiliation: Christian
- Opened: 1979
- Head of school: Healey Glessner
- Teaching staff: 21.3 (FTE)
- Grades: PK–12
- Enrollment: 275 (2017-2018)
- Student to teacher ratio: 10.5
- Colors: Green, blue, white
- Athletics: District 13-C
- Athletics conference: Western C Division
- Nickname: Eagles
- Accreditation: Montana OPI, ACSI
- Website: www.valleychristian.org

Valley Christian School is a private Christian school located in Missoula, Montana. Valley Christian is part of the Montana High School Association. Both girl and boy teams are named the Eagles. Valley Christian School is accredited with the Montana Office of Public Instruction.

== History ==
Valley Christian was founded in 1979 with approximately 25 students.
