= Scobey Schools =

School district in Montana, USA

Coordinates: 48.7915219°N 105.4169602°W

Scobey Schools is a kindergarten to 12th grade district located in Scobey, Montana. The school provides a wide variety of academic, fine art, vocational, and athletic programs, as well as various adult education courses. In addition, special academic programs are available for students from preschool age through grade 12. Scobey Schools also houses the elementary, middle, and high schools in one building,

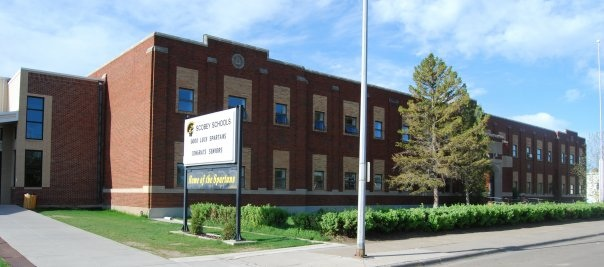
View of Scobey High School

== Academics ==
Scobey Schools is the only K-12 school in Daniels County. For the 2021-2022 school year, 279 students were enrolled from K-12. Scobey Schools offers all core classes, such as English, history, mathematics, in addition to elective courses. Elective classes provided at the school include psychology, computer programming, Spanish, and various shop classes. In 2012, the school purchased each student an Apple iPad to use for an E-Textbook.

== Sports ==
Scobey Schools is a Class C school, which is a designation for determining competing schools, and provides sports year round. Fall athletics include volleyball and football. During the winter months all students have the option to play on the school's basketball teams. Scobey Schools offers high school, junior high, and elementary basketball programs. Spring season sports include golf or track and field, while junior-high students can only be in the track and field program.

== School information ==
- Scobey Schools has the capacity to offer its students college and other high school courses through its instructional television system and digital academy.
- The school houses an up-to-date library, complete with audio and visual materials. The library, computer labs, and classrooms are equipped with networked computers with Internet access.
- Scobey Schools is one of the few schools in Montana to provide each student (K-12) with an Apple iPad
- Scobey School requires a minimum of 24 credits for graduation, while the state minimum is only 20 credits.
