= Seeley-Swan High School =

Location
- 456 Airport Road; Seeley Lake, Montana 59868; United States; 47.1744°N 113.4674°W

Information
- Type: Public
- School district: Missoula County Public Schools District No. 1
- Teaching staff: 11.08 (FTE)
- Enrollment: 101 (2023–2024)
- Student to teacher ratio: 9.12
- Color
- Mascot: Black hawk
- Website: seeleyswan.mcpsmt.org

Seeley-Swan High School is an American public high school located in Seeley Lake, Montana, United States. It is a part of the Missoula County Public Schools, and the only school in the district that does not lie within the city boundaries of Missoula. The school fluctuates in size from about 90 students to 110 students depending on the year. As of 2014 there were 111 students. This rise and fall of students gives the school the chance to jump back and forth from a class C to a class B school. Seeley-Swan High School gets its name because the Swan Valley residents commute to Seeley for high school. The school is 52 miles from Missoula and 63 from Bigfork. It is located between the Swan Range and Mission Mountains.

== Programs ==
- Band – Seeley-Swan offers concert band, marching band, and jazz band.
- Orchestra
- Choir
- Drama

== Athletics ==
- Boys basketball
- Girls basketball
- Cross country
- Football
- Golf
- Volleyball
- Track and field

== Clubs and activities ==
- Greenhouse
- National Honor Society
- Outdoor club
- Student Government
- Yearbook
