= Frenchtown High School =

Location
- 17620 Frenchtown Frontage Road, PO Box 117; Frenchtown, Montana 59835; United States; 47°01′10″N 114°14′31″W

Information
- School type: Public, secondary school
- School district: Frenchtown School District No. 40
- Principal: Jake Haynes
- Teaching staff: 31.30 (FTE)
- Grades: 9–12
- Enrollment: 453 (2023–2024)
- Student to teacher ratio: 14.47
- Language: English
- Campus: Suburban/Rural
- Colors: Orange, Black, and Silver
- Team name: Broncs
- Communities served: Frenchtown, Huson, Wye, Evaro
- Website: Frenchtown High School

Frenchtown High School is located in Frenchtown, Missoula County, Montana, United States.

== Academic team ==
Frenchtown High School's academic team has performed well at regional and statewide levels, placing first out of 16 teams at Brainfreeze in the 2010 and 2011 season. In the 2012 season, Frenchtown took 1st out of 51 teams at the Southwest Montana Academic Olympics and 1st at the Yellowstone County Invitational Academic Tournament. In 2009, the team won the Frenchtown-Stevensville Invitational Academic Tournament and were able to travel to Chicago for the HSNCT. In the 2010 season, Frenchtown hosted a tournament titled Brainfreeze. Frenchtown's #1 team triumphed over teams such as Billings Skyview and Missoula Sentinel to capture first place and qualify for the PACE National Scholastics Championship in Fairfax, Virginia. In 2013, Frenchtown took 1st place at the World Affairs Council Academic Tournament, and has been invited to nationals in Washington, D.C., and in 2012. The team finished the Jordan Carlson Memorial Academic Tournament in first, second, third, and fourth place. Over the last few years, Frenchtown's team has developed a friendly rivalry with Billings Skyview, as well as Park High Livingston. Frenchtown's first venture into academic competition began with the Brainbuster program on KECI-TV, which lasted three years.

== Softball ==
In the 2009 season, the Broncs softball team were Class A State Champions.

== Fall sports ==
- Boys Cross Country
- Girls Cross Country
- Boys Golf
- Girls Golf
- Boys Soccer
- Girls Soccer
- Football (Won state in Class A during the 2009 season)
- Girls Volleyball

== Winter sports ==
- Boys Basketball
- Girls Basketball
- Wrestling

== Spring sports ==
- Softball
- Boys Track and Field
- Girls Track and Field
