= Poplar High School =

Location
- 400 4th Avenue West; Poplar, Montana; United States; 48°06′45″N 105°12′10″W

Information
- Type: Free public
- School district: Poplar School District 9 & 9B
- Principal: Dwain Haggard
- Teaching staff: 20.50 (FTE)
- Grades: 9th–12th
- Enrollment: 272 (2023–2024)
- Student to teacher ratio: 13.27
- Campus type: Reservation
- Colors: Maroon and gold
- Mascot: Indians
- Website: www.poplarschools.com

Poplar High School is a high school (grades 9–12) in the small town of Poplar, Roosevelt County, Montana, United States.

In 2007 it had 200 plus students and 25 teachers.

== See also ==
- List of high schools in Montana
