= Dawson County High School (Glendive, Montana) =

Public high school in Montana

Coordinates: 47.11242°N 104.70675°W

Location
- 900 North Merrill Avenue; Glendive, (Dawson County), Montana 59330; United States

Information
- Type: Public high school
- Principal: Amy Ree
- Staff: 24.67 (FTE)
- Enrollment: 336 (2023-2024)
- Student to teacher ratio: 13.62
- Colors: Red and white
- Nickname: Red Devils

Dawson County High School is a public high school in Glendive, Montana the eastern part of Montana known as the Badlands.

== Notable alumni ==
- Tim Babcock, the 16th Governor of the state of Montana, from 1962 to 1969
- Mike Person, an American football guard for the San Francisco 49ers of the National Football League (NFL)

== Notable former faculty ==
- James Verne Dusenberry, taught English and Drama
