= Chinook High School (Montana) =

Public high school in Montana

Coordinates: 48.59°N 109.229°W

Location
- 528 Ohio Street #1059; Chinook, (Blaine County), Montana 59523; United States

Information
- Type: Public high school
- Principal: Brian Rayburn
- Staff: 9.76 (FTE)
- Enrollment: 118 (2023-2024)
- Student to teacher ratio: 12.09
- Colors: Black and orange
- Nickname: Sugarbeeter
- Website: www.chinookschools.org

Chinook High School is a high school (grades 9-12) in the town of Chinook, Blaine County, Montana. Its notable alumni include Mike Tilleman.

== History ==
As the town of Chinook was known historically for its sugar beet production in the early-to-mid 1900s, the local sugar beet factory donated sugar beet emblazoned uniforms to the high school's boys' basketball team, which is how they became known as the "Sugar Beeters".

== See also ==
- List of high schools in Montana
