= Shelby High School (Montana) =

Location
- 1001 Valley St, Shelby, MT 59474
- Coordinates: 48°30′54″N 111°51′49″W

Information
- Teaching staff: 13.51 (FTE)
- Enrollment: 129 (2023-2024)
- Student to teacher ratio: 9.55
- Colors: Maroon and Gold
- Mascot: Coyote
- Website: https://www.shelbypublicschools.org/

Shelby High School is a public high school located in Shelby, Montana; the school offers grades 9 through 12. The school is part of the Shelby Public Schools District. Shelby High School's student population is 120.

== Notable alumni ==
- Jack Horner, born in 1946 in Shelby, a paleontologist who graduated in 1964 at Shelby High School and who later, in 1978, co-discovered Maiasaura, the first dinosaur eggs ever found in North America, and the first evidence of dinosaur parental care.
