= Red Lodge High School =

- Logo of the Red Lodge High School Rams

Location
- East 2nd Street, P.O. Box 1090; Red Lodge, Montana 59068; United States; 45°11′42″N 109°14′27″W

Information
- Type: Public secondary
- School district: Red Lodge Public School District
- Principal: Rex Ternan
- Staff: 14.75 (FTE)
- Grades: 9–12
- Enrollment: 176 (2023–2024)
- Student to teacher ratio: 11.93
- Colors: Blue and Gold
- Mascot: Redskins (founding–2011); Rams (2011–present)
- Website: School website

Red Lodge High School is a high school that serves several towns in Carbon County, Montana, including Red Lodge, Luther, and Washoe. Approximately 200 students attend the school. Red Lodge High School is located near the northern end of Red Lodge, adjacent to the sports fields and Yellowstone Wildlife Sanctuary.

== Construction ==
The first Red Lodge High School was built in 1962, however in April 2009 the students moved across town into a brand new high school. Construction began in June 2008. With Collaborative Design Architects creating the design and Hardy Construction building, the architecture prides itself to be environmentally friendly and cost $7.3 million. Some of the features of the design are two computer labs, two science labs, and a spacious common area with a fireplace. In 2010, a full size tournament-size gymnasium (22,000-square-feet) that seats up to 2,300 people was finished. The gymnasium cost approximately $2.4 million to build. $1 million was received from the Montana Department of Commerce Quality Schools Project Grant. The gym allows the town to host regional tournaments, which in turn brings more business to Red Lodge.

The community felt the need for a new high school because middle school students were forced to walk four blocks to access lunch and gym facilities, which meant that some students were walking back and forth between schools up to four times a day. The main concern was the safety of the students regarding both traffic and extreme weather conditions. After examining various options, the Red Lodge school board decided the best option would be to build a new high school, and migrate the middle school into the old high school. $2.2 million worth of renovations were executed on the old high school to update the building for a safer school environment.

== Mascot change ==
In 2011, Red Lodge High School’s mascot officially changed from the Redskins to the Rams. In previous years, discrepancies about the term Redskins being a derogatory term towards Native Americans had been heavily scrutinized. However, Red Lodge High School alumni had pride in the Redskin mascot, it had been the mascot for over 50 years. But, in 2010 after many discussions in the school, community and county amongst many individuals, including Native Americans, the decision to change the mascot was made. All Red Lodge students were able to suggest new mascots, and after the school board narrowed it down to three choices, the students voted on their favorite.
