= Glacier High School =

High school in Montana, United States

Coordinates: 48.2385°N 114.3448°W

Location
- 375 Wolfpack Way; Kalispell, (Flathead County), Montana 59901; United States

Information
- Type: Public high school
- Principal: Brad Holloway
- Staff: 95.40 (FTE)
- Enrollment: 1,477 (2023–2024)
- Student to teacher ratio: 15.48
- Colors: Navy and kelly green
- Nickname: Wolfpack

Glacier High School is an American public secondary school located in Kalispell, Montana, United States. Along with Flathead High School, it is one of two high schools in Kalispell School District #5.

== History ==
Glacier High School was built between 2005 and 2007. It first opened for freshmen, sophomores, and juniors in the fall of 2007, adding the senior class in 2008. During the 2023–2024 school year, spring enrollment at Glacier was 1,425.

== Athletics/activities ==
The Glacier High School teams are known as the Wolfpack. They compete in class AA in Montana and there are fourteen sports offered.

=== State championships ===
- Football – 2014 and 2025
