= Fort Benton High School =

Location
- 1820 Washington Street; Fort Benton, Montana; United States; 47°49′23″N 110°40′03″W

Information
- Type: Public
- Established: 1921
- Principal: Pat Hould
- Staff: 7.58 (FTE)
- Enrollment: 111 (2023–2024)
- Student to teacher ratio: 14.64
- Campus: Rural
- Colors: White, red and gold
- Sports: Football, girls’ volleyball, boys' basketball, girls' basketball, girls' & boys' wrestling, track & field, boys' & girls' golf, girls' & boys' tennis, cross country
- Mascot: Longhorns
- Affiliations: Cheerleading, majorettes, speech & drama, band, choir, newspaper/annual, B club, student council, National Honor Society, Spanish club, and pep club
- Website: www.fortbentonschools.com/hs--ms.html

Fort Benton High School is a high school in Fort Benton, Montana.

The district serves students living in Fort Benton, Loma, and Carter, with total population nearing 2,000 people. The sports teams are called the Fort Benton Longhorns.

== History ==
Fort Benton's first school opened in 1868, over twenty years before statehood. Upon statehood in 1889, the Enabling Act attempted to set aside sections 16 and 36 in each township to financially support education. If section 16 or 36 were already claimed, another selection was made in lieu. The tract on which the Eagle Butte School is located is such a tract. Chouteau County established the Eagle Butte School District in 1912. That year, approximately 27 children attended school for one to two months in abandoned homestead shacks. School construction began in 1914. A storm demolished the partially completed building, but this clapboard-sided school was ultimately ready for students in August 1915. After 1918, drought and agricultural depression led to declining enrollments. The school remained open by merging with South Eagle Butte School in 1924. By 1964, Geraldine Elementary annexed the Eagle Butte district.

== Athletics ==
The Fort Benton Longhorns have had to move with the economy with what District, Division, and Classification they are placed in. Being one of the original founding schools in the MHSA, Classifications:

- Class AA 1891-1931
- Class A 1932-1977
- Class B 1978-1982
- Class A 1983-1988
- Class B 1989-2008
- Class C 2009-Spring 2025
- Class B Beginning Fall 2025
- Central A
- Northern A
- Northeast B
- Northern B
- Southern B
- South/Central B
- Northern C
- District 1B
- District 6B
- District 7C/8C
- District 9C

=== Football ===
The Longhorn Football team holds the longest running state playoff record out of all Class A' B' and C' Schools 20 state playoff shows from the Longhorns.

- State Championships: 2002,
- State Runner-Up: 2003, 2004

=== Volleyball ===
Fort Benton Volleyball

- State Champions:
- State Place:
- Division Champions: 2019, 2010, 1993, 1992
- Division Place: 4th-2009, 4th-2008, 3rd-2007
- District Champions: 1993, 1992, 1991
- District Place: 2nd-2019 3rd-2010 2nd-2009, 4th-2008, 3rd-2007, 2nd-2006

=== Boys' Basketball ===
State Champions: 1953, 1952, 1951
State Place: 3rd/4th-2020 3rd-1973, 2nd-1972, 2nd-1956, 2nd-1955, 2nd-1954, 2nd-1950
Division Champions: 2020, 1973, 1972, 1956, 1955, 1954, 1953, 1952, 1951, 1950
Division Place: 4th-2006
District Champions: 2020, 2010, 2006,
District Place: 2nd-2019 3rd-2018, 3rd-2009, 4th-2008, 2nd-2007, 2nd-1996, 2nd-1992, 2nd-1991,

=== Girls' Basketball ===
First Girls Basketball State Championship 2020-2021 State C Champions

State Place: 3rd-2003, 2nd-2000
Division Champions: 2002, 2000
Division Place: 3rd-2020 3rd-2017, 2nd-2003, 2nd-1999, 3rd-1998
District Champions: 2020, 2019, 2018, 2014, 2003, 2002, 2001, 2000, 1999
District Place: 2nd-2017, 4th-2010, 4th-2009, 3rd-2007, 2nd-1998

=== Boys' and Girls' Wrestling ===
Boys' State Championships: 2013
Boys' State Place:
Boys' Division Championships:
Boys' Division Place:
Girls' State Championships: 2026
Girls' State Place: 3rd-2025
Girls' Division Championships: 2026, 2025
Girls' Division Place:

=== Boys' and Girls' Track ===
Boys' State Championships: 2003, 2001, 1987, 1986, 1985
Boys' Divisional Championships: 2019
Boys' District Championships: 2019
Girls' State Championships: 2017, 1997, 1983, 1982
Girls' State Place: 3rd-2019 2nd-2018
Girls' Divisional Championships: 2019, 2018, 2017, 2016
Girls' District Championships: 2019, 2018, 2017

=== Golf ===
Boys' State Championships: 2011, 2010, 2000
Girls' State Championships: 2011, 2010, 1997, 1996, 1994, 1993, 1992

=== Tennis ===
State Champions:
State Runner-up: 1992 1993 1994 1995 1996

=== Gymnastics ===
Program Retired
State Championships: 1973
State Runner-ups: 1972 1974 1975 1976 1978 1979 1980

== Activities ==
- Cheerleading
- B Club - creates banners supporting the classes and sports teams that are displayed in the gymnasium. They are also responsible for creating locker signs for participants in athletics and activities.
- National Honor Society
- Band - Pep band plays at almost all FBHS athletic events
- Choir
- Speech and Drama - Divisional Championships: 2014, 2013, State Championships: 2010, 1953
- Newspaper/Annual -This group is responsible for the production and quality of the Annual yearbook.

== Chouteau County High School ==
Fort Benton High School was originally named back in 1891 when the first building was built Chouteau County High School which served all towns in Chouteau County which the high school first had about 200 students and then after the first building burnt to the ground in 1920 and the new building currently housing the high school was built the school split into 4 high schools Highwood, Geraldine, Big Sandy, and Fort Benton.

Currently Fort Benton has two buildings. Big Sandy two, Highwood one, and Geraldine has one.
