= Corvallis High School (Montana) =

Coordinates: 46.3165°N 114.116°W

Location
- 1045 Main; Corvallis, Ravalli County, Montana; United States

Information
- Superintendent: Pete Joseph
- NCES School ID: 300741000215
- Principal: Cammie Knapp
- Teaching staff: 30.25 (FTE)
- Grades: 9–12
- Enrollment: 446 (2023–2024)
- Student to teacher ratio: 14.74
- Colors: Royal blue and white
- Team name: Blue Devils
- Website: www.corvallisschools.org/o/chs

Corvallis High School is a public high school located in Corvallis, Montana, United States. It serves grades nine through twelve in the Corvallis Schools district. It had 442 students as of the 2012–2013 school year. The school's mascot is a Blue Devil.

== Athletics and activities ==
- Speech and debate
- Girls' basketball
- Boys' basketball
- Track
- Cross country
- Girls' soccer
- Boys' soccer
- Cheer
- Tennis
- Golf
- Baseball
- Volleyball
- Football
- Softball
- Wrestling

=== State championships ===
- Speech and debate: Drama State Champions 1994, 2003, 2004, 2006, 2007, 2009, 2010, 2012, 2014-2018
- Boys' basketball: 1962
- Girls' track: Class B; 1974, Class A; 2011-2016, 2023, 2024
- Boys' track: Class B; 1977, Class A; 2009, 2010, 2012, 2015, 2018, 2023, 2024
- Girls' cross country: Class A; 2011, 2015
- Boys' cross country: Class A; 2010, 2011, 2015, 2017
- Girls' soccer: Class A; 2003
- Boys' soccer: Class A; 2014, 2015
- Girls' tennis: Class A; 2013, 2014
- Boys' tennis: Class A; 2006, 2010-2012, 2018 (tie)
- Girls' volleyball: Class A; 2013, 2019
- Football: Class B; 1976
- Wrestling: Class B-C; 1996 Class A; 2002 2012

== Notable alumni ==
- Huckleberry "Huck" Seed, professional poker player
