= Powder River County District High School =

Location
- 500 N Trautman; Broadus, Montana 59317; United States; 45.4470°N 105.4045°W

Information
- Type: Public
- Established: 1924
- Principal: Denise Ternes
- Staff: 9.22 (FTE)
- Grades: 9-12
- Enrollment: 63 (2023–2024)
- Student to teacher ratio: 6.83
- Color
- Sports: Football, Girls' Volleyball, Boys' Basketball, Girls' Basketball, Wrestling, Track and Field, Girls' Golf, Boys' Golf, Girls Cross-Country, and Cheerleading
- Mascot: Hawk

Powder River County District High School (PRCDHS) is the only high school in Powder River County, Montana, in the United States and is located in Broadus, the only incorporated town in that county.

== Academics ==
As of November 1, 2014, the Powder River County District High School had 135 enrolled students, coming from four counties (Powder River, Rosebud, Carter, and Custer) in Southeastern Montana, and some from Crook County in Wyoming. The school supports eight school buses bringing students from the census-designated places Ashland and Biddle and the unincorporated communities Boyes, Hammond, Coalwood, Powderville, and Volborg. Activities include Business Professionals of America (BPA), Future Farmers of America (FFA), Students Against Destructive Decisions (SADD), speech and drama, and music.

== Athletics ==
The school's mascot is the hawk, and its colors are green, white, and gold. Athletics include football, girls' volleyball, boys' basketball, girls' basketball, wrestling, track and field, girls' golf, boys' golf, girls cross-country, and cheerleading.
