= List of battles fought in Montana =

This is an incomplete list of military and other armed confrontations that have occurred within the boundaries of the modern US State of Montana since European contact. The region was part of the Viceroyalty of New Spain from 1535 to 1679, New France from 1679 to 1803, and part of the United States of America from 1803–present.

The Plains Indian Wars directly affected the region during westward expansion.

== Battles ==
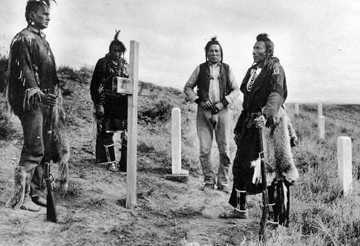
Former US Army Crow Scouts at the Little Bighorn battlefield in Montana, circa 1913. (Left to right) White Man Runs Him, Hairy Moccasin, Curly and Goes Ahead

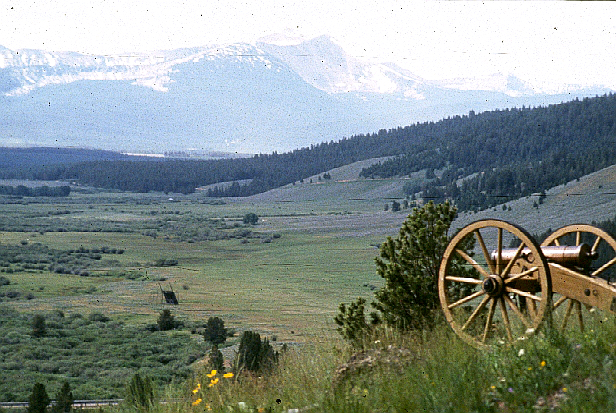
Big Hole Battlefield

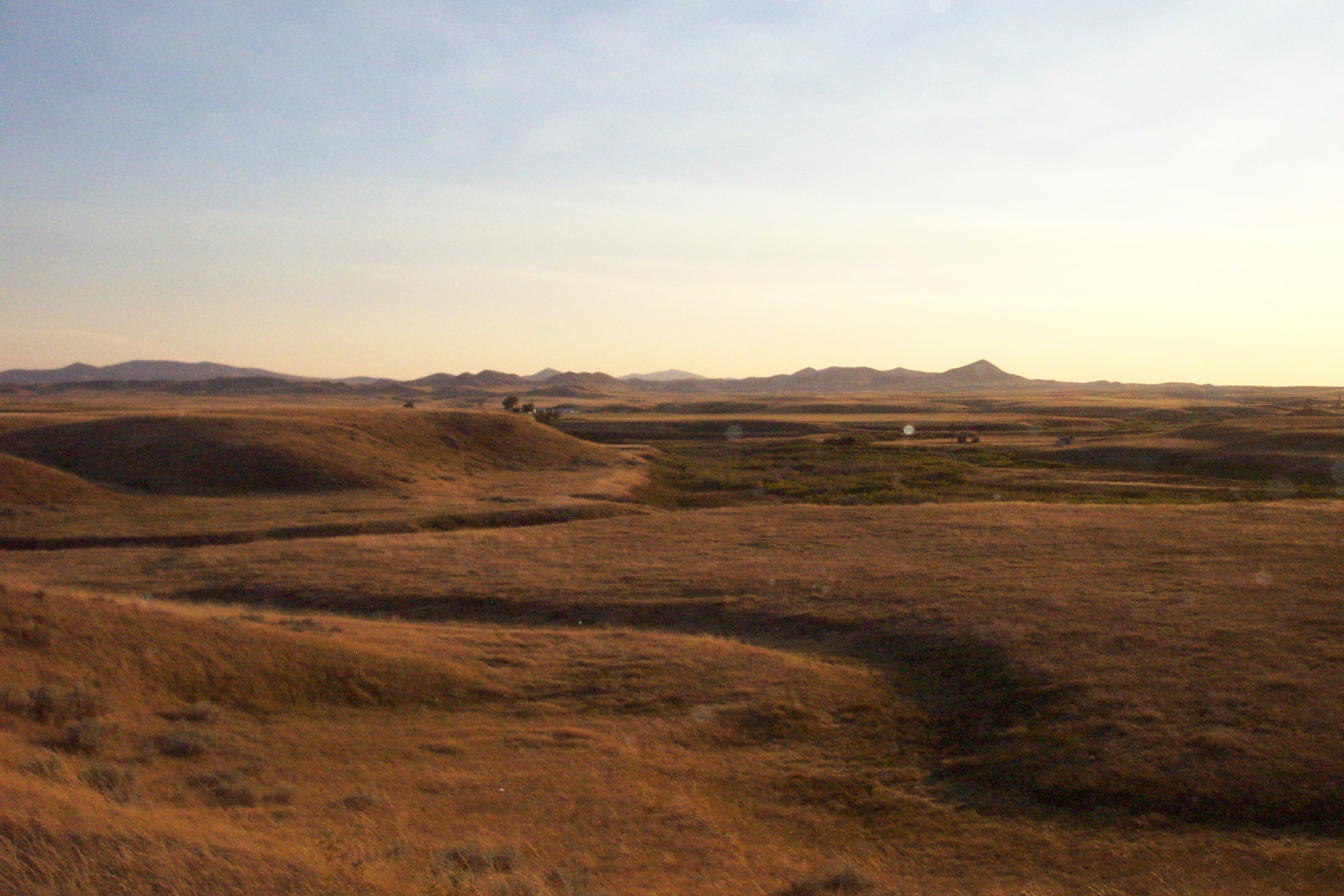
Bear Paw Battlefield

Name	Date	Location	War	Campaign	Dead	Belligerents
Battle of Alkali Creek	September 1, 1865	along Powder River near modern Powderville	Sioux Wars	Powder River Expedition	8	United States vs. Sioux
Battle of Dry Creek	September 8, 1865	along Powder River near modern Broadus	Sioux Wars	Powder River Expedition	2	United States vs. Cheyenne, Sioux & Arapaho
Hayfield Fight	August 1, 1867	near Fort C. F. Smith	Sioux Wars	Red Cloud's War	26	United States & civilian workers vs. Cheyenne & Sioux
Battle of Sixteenmile Creek	April 7, 1869	near modern Ringling			10	United States & civilians vs. Blackfoot Confederacy
Marias Massacre	January 23, 1870	along Marias River			218	United States vs. Piegan
Battle of Bighorn River	August 11, 1873	along Yellowstone River near modern Custer	Sioux Wars	Yellowstone Expedition of 1873	7	United States of America vs. Sioux
Battle of Powder River	March 17, 1876	along Powder River near modern Moorhead	Sioux Wars	Great Sioux War of 1876	6	United States vs. Cheyenne & Lakota
Battle of the Rosebud	June 17, 1876	modern Big Horn County	Sioux Wars	Great Sioux War of 1876	42	United States vs. Lakota & Cheyenne
Battle of the Little Bighorn	June 25–26, 1876	modern Big Horn County	Sioux Wars	Great Sioux War of 1876	404	United States vs. Lakota, Cheyenne, & Arapaho
Battle of the Cedar Creek	October 21, 1876	near modern Terry	Sioux Wars	Great Sioux War of 1876	8	United States, Shoshone, & Crow vs. Lakota
Battle of Wolf Mountain	January 8, 1877	near modern Birney	Sioux Wars	Great Sioux War of 1876	11	United States vs. Lakota & Cheyenne
Battle of Little Muddy Creek	May 7, 1877	near modern Lame Deer	Sioux Wars	Great Sioux War of 1876	18	United States vs. Lakota & Cheyenne
Battle of the Big Hole	August 9–10, 1877	Beaverhead County	Nez Perce War		118	United States vs. Nez Perce & Palouse
Battle of Canyon Creek	September 13, 1877	near Billings	Nez Perce War		7	United States & Crow vs. Nez Perce
Battle of Bear Paw	September 30 – October 5, 1877	near modern Chinook	Nez Perce War		49	United States vs. Nez Perce
Battle of Pumpkin Creek	February 7, 1880	near modern Volborg	Sioux Wars		3	United States vs. Lakota
Battle of Milk River	July 17, 1879	near modern Saco	Sioux Wars		6	United States vs. Lakota
Battle of Poplar River	January 2, 1881	near Camp Poplar River	Sioux Wars		8	United States vs. Lakota
Battle of Crow Agency	November 5, 1887	near Crow Agency	Crow War		8	United States vs. Crow

== See also ==
- History of Montana
- Plains Indians Wars
