= List of high schools in Montana =

This is a list of high schools in the state of Montana.

The Montana High School Association is the governing body of high school athletics. Schools are assigned a class to determine athletic competitions. The enrollment criteria for each class is: 801 and up for Class AA, 301-800 for Class A, 101-300 for Class B and 1-100 for Class C.

== Beaverhead County ==
- Beaverhead County High School, Dillon, Class A
- Lima High School, Lima, Class C

== Big Horn County ==
- Hardin High School, Hardin, Class A
- Lodge Grass High School, Lodge Grass, Class B
- Northern Cheyenne High School, Busby, Class C
- Northern Cheyenne Tribal School, Busby (Non Affiliated with MHSA - no classification)
- Plenty Coups High School, Pryor, Class C

== Blaine County ==
- Chinook High School, Chinook, Class B
- Harlem High School, Harlem, Class B
- Hays-Lodge Pole High School, Hays, Class C
- Turner High School, Turner, Class C

== Broadwater County ==
- Broadwater High School, Townsend, Class B

== Carbon County ==
- Belfry High School, Belfry, Class C
- Bridger High School, Bridger, Class C
- Fromberg High School, Fromberg, Class C
- Joliet High School, Joliet, Class B
- Red Lodge High School, Red Lodge, Class B
- Roberts High School, Roberts, Class C

== Carter County ==
- Carter County High School, Ekalaka, Class C

== Cascade County ==
- Belt High School, Belt, Class C
- Cascade High School, Cascade, Class B
- Centerville High School, Centerville, Class C
- Charles M. Russell High School (CMR), Great Falls, Class AA
- Great Falls Central Catholic High School, Great Falls, Class B
- Great Falls High School, Great Falls, Class AA
- Montana School for Deaf & Blind High, Great Falls, Class C
- Paris Gibson Education Center, Great Falls
- Simms High School, Simms, Class C

== Chouteau County ==
- Big Sandy High School, Big Sandy, Class C
- Fort Benton High School, Fort Benton, Class B
- Geraldine High School, Geraldine, Class C
- Highwood High School, Highwood, Class C

== Custer County ==
- Custer County High School, Miles City, Class A

== Daniels County ==
- Scobey High School, Scobey, Class C

== Dawson County ==
- Dawson High School, Glendive, Class A
- Richey High School, Richey, Class C

== Deer Lodge County ==
- Anaconda High School, Anaconda, Class B

== Fallon County ==
- Baker High School, Baker, Class B
- Plevna High School, Plevna, Class C

== Fergus County ==
- Denton High School, Denton, Class C
- Fergus County High School, Lewistown, Class A
- Grass Range High School, Grass Range, Class C
- Moore High School, Moore, Class C
- Roy High School, Roy, Class C
- Winifred High School, Winifred, Class C

== Flathead County ==
- Bigfork High School, Bigfork, Class A
- Columbia Falls High School, Columbia Falls, Class A
- Flathead High School, Kalispell, Class AA
- Glacier High School, Kalispell, Class AA
- Stillwater Christian School, Kalispell, [Non Affiliated with MHSA - no classification]
- Whitefish High School, Whitefish, Class A

== Gallatin County ==
- Belgrade High School, Belgrade, Class AA
- Bozeman High School, Bozeman, Class AA
- Gallatin High School, Bozeman, Class AA
- Heritage Christian School, Bozeman [Non affiliated with MHSA - no classification]
- Lone Peak High School, Big Sky, Montana, Class B
- Manhattan Christian School, Churchill, Class C
- Manhattan High School, Manhattan, Class B
- Mount Ellis Academy, Bozeman, [Non affiliated with MHSA - no classification]
- Three Forks High School, Three Forks, Class B
- West Yellowstone High School, West Yellowstone, Class C
- Willow Creek High School, Willow Creek, Class C

== Garfield County ==
- Garfield County District High School, Jordan, Class C

== Glacier County ==
- Browning High School, Browning, Class A
- Cut Bank High School, Cut Bank, Class B

== Golden Valley County ==
- Lavina High School, Lavina, Class C
- Ryegate High School, Ryegate, Class C

== Granite County ==
- Drummond High School, Drummond, Class C
- Granite High School, Philipsburg, Class C

== Hill County ==
- Box Elder High School, Box Elder, Class C
- Rocky Boy High School, Box Elder, Class B
- Havre High School, Havre, Class A
- North Star High School, Rudyard, Class C

== Jefferson County ==
- Jefferson High School, Boulder, Class B
- Whitehall High School, Whitehall, Class B

== Judith Basin County ==
- Geyser High School, Geyser, Class C
- Hobson High School, Hobson, Class C
- Stanford High School, Stanford, Class C

== Lake County ==
- Arlee High School, Arlee, Class B
- Charlo High School, Charlo, Class C
- Two Eagle River School, Pablo, Class C
- Polson High School, Polson, Class A
- Ronan High School, Ronan, Class A
- Mission High School, St. Ignatius, Class B

== Lewis and Clark County ==
- Augusta High School, Augusta, Class C
- Capital High School, Helena, Class AA
- East Helena High School, East Helena, Class A
- Helena High School, Helena, Class AA
- Lincoln High School, Lincoln, Class C

== Liberty County ==
- Chester-Joplin-Inverness High School (CJI), Chester, Class C

== Lincoln County ==
- Lincoln County High School, Eureka, Class B
- Libby High School, Libby, Class A
- Troy High School, Troy, Class C

== Madison County ==
- Ennis High School, Ennis, Class B
- Harrison High School, Harrison, Class C
- Sheridan High School, Sheridan, Class C
- Twin Bridges High School, Twin Bridges, Class C

== McCone County ==
- Circle High School, Circle, Class C

== Meagher County ==
- White Sulphur Springs High School, White Sulphur Springs, Class C

== Mineral County ==
- Alberton High School, Alberton, Class C
- St. Regis High School, St. Regis, Class C
- Superior High School, Superior, Class C

== Missoula County ==
- Big Sky High School, Missoula, Class AA
- Frenchtown High School, Frenchtown, Class A
- Hellgate High School, Missoula, Class AA
- Loyola Sacred Heart High School, Missoula, Class B
- Missoula International School, Missoula
- Seeley-Swan High School, Seeley Lake, Class C
- Sentinel High School, Missoula, Class AA
- Valley Christian School, Missoula, Class C
- Willard Alternative High School, Missoula

== Musselshell County ==
- Melstone High School, Melstone, Class C
- Roundup High School, Roundup, Class B

== Park County ==
- Gardiner High School, Gardiner, Class C
- Park High School, Livingston, Class A
- Shields Valley High School, Clyde Park, Class C

== Petroleum County ==
- Winnett High School, Winnett, Class C

== Phillips County ==
- Dodson High School, Dodson, Class C
- Malta High School, Malta, Class B
- Saco High School, Saco, Class C
- Whitewater High School, Whitewater, Class C

== Pondera County ==
- Conrad High School, Conrad, Class B
- Heart Butte High School, Heart Butte, Class C
- Valier High School, Valier, Class C

== Powder River County ==
- Powder River County District High School, Broadus, Class C

== Powell County ==
- Powell County High School, Deer Lodge, Class B

== Prairie County ==
- Terry High School, Terry, Class C

== Ravalli County ==
- Corvallis High School, Corvallis, Class A
- Darby High School, Darby, Class C
- Florence-Carlton High School, Florence, Class B
- Hamilton High School, Hamilton, Class A
- Stevensville High School, Stevensville, Class A
- Victor High School, Victor, Class C

== Richland County ==
- Fairview High School, Fairview, Class C
- Lambert High School, Lambert, Class C
- Savage High School, Savage, Class C
- Sidney High School, Sidney, Class A

== Roosevelt County ==
- Bainville High School, Bainville, Class C
- Brockton High School, Brockton, Class C
- Culbertson High School, Culbertson, Class C
- Froid High School, Froid, Class C
- Poplar High School, Poplar, Class B
- Wolf Point High School, Wolf Point, Class B

== Rosebud County ==
- Colstrip High School, Colstrip, Class B
- Forsyth High School, Forsyth, Class C
- Lame Deer High School, Lame Deer, Class B
- Rosebud High School, Rosebud, Class C
- St. Labre Indian Catholic High School, Ashland, Class B

== Sanders County ==
- Hot Springs High School, Hot Springs, Class C
- Noxon High School, Noxon, Class C
- Plains High School, Plains, Class C
- Thompson Falls High School, Thompson Falls, Class B

== Sheridan County ==
- Medicine Lake High School, Medicine Lake, Class C
- Plentywood High School, Plentywood, Class C
- Westby High School, Westby, Class C

== Silver Bow County ==
- Butte Central Catholic High School, Butte, Class A
- Butte High School, Butte, Class AA

== Stillwater County ==
- Absarokee High School, Absarokee, Class C
- Columbus High School, Columbus, Class B
- Park City High School, Park City, Class C
- Rapelje High School, Rapelje, Class C
- Reed Point High School, Reed Point, Class C

== Sweet Grass County ==
- Sweet Grass County High School, Big Timber, Class B

== Teton County ==
- Choteau High School, Choteau, Class B
- Dutton/Brady High School, Dutton, Class C
- Fairfield High School, Fairfield, Class B
- Power High School, Power, Class C

== Toole County ==
- North Toole County High School, Sunburst, Class C
- Shelby High School, Shelby, Class B

== Treasure County ==
- Hysham High School, Hysham, Class C

== Valley County ==
- Frazer High School, Frazer, Class C
- Lustre Christian High School, Lustre, Class C
- Glasgow High School, Glasgow, Class B
- Hinsdale High School, Hinsdale, Class C
- Nashua High School, Nashua, Class C
- Opheim High School, Opheim, Class C

== Wheatland County ==
- Harlowton High School, Harlowton, Class C
- Judith Gap High School, Judith Gap, Class C

== Wibaux County ==
- Wibaux High School, Wibaux, Class C

== Yellowstone County ==
- Billings Central Catholic High School, Billings, Class A
- Billings Senior High School, Billings, Class AA
- Billings West High School, Billings, Class AA
- Broadview High School, Broadview, Class C
- Custer High School, Custer, Class C
- Huntley Project High School, Worden, Class B
- Laurel High School, Laurel, Class A
- Lockwood High School, Lockwood, Class A
- Rimrock Christian High School, Billings, [Non affiliated with MHSA - no classification]
- Shepherd High School, Shepherd, Class B
- Skyview High School, Billings, Class AA
- Yellowstone Academy, Billings, [Non affiliated with MHSA - no classification]
