= Lists of battles fought in U.S. states =

These are lists of battles fought in U.S. states by state in alphabetical order.

- List of battles fought in Colorado
- List of battles fought in Illinois
- List of battles fought in Indiana
- List of battles fought in Kansas
- List of battles fought in Kentucky
- List of battles fought in Missouri
- List of battles fought in Montana
- List of battles fought in Nebraska
- List of battles fought in New Mexico
- List of battles fought in North Dakota
- List of battles fought in Ohio
- List of battles fought in Oklahoma
- List of battles fought in Vermont

== See also ==
- Battles in locations now part of the territory of the United States by war:
  - List of American Revolutionary War battles
  - List of American Civil War battles
- Conflicts (broadly defined) in locations now part of the territory of the United States:
  - List of conflicts in British America (until 1783)
  - List of conflicts in the United States (after 1783)
  - List of conflicts in Hawaii (11th century – present)
- Armed conflicts, battles and wars with the United States as a participant:
  - List of battles with most United States military fatalities
  - List of wars involving the United States
