= Ridge, Montana =

Unincorporated community in Montana, United States

Coordinates: 45°02′49″N 105°01′13″W

- Unincorporated community
- Interactive map of Ridge, Montana
- Country: United States
- State: Montana
- County: Carter
- Elevation: 3,970 ft (1,210 m)
- Time zone: Mountain (MST)
  - Summer (DST): MDT
- Postal code: 59311
- Area code: 406
- GNIS feature ID: 802173

Ridge is an unincorporated community in Carter County, Montana, United States. It is located approximately 15 miles (24 km) south of Boyes, and about 16 miles (26 km) east of Biddle. Its elevation is 3,970 feet.

== Geography ==
Ridge appears on the Belle Creek South U.S. Geological Survey Map. Carter County is in the Mountain Time Zone (UTC -7 hours).

== Climate ==
According to the Köppen Climate Classification system, Ridge has a semi-arid climate, abbreviated "BSk" on climate maps.
