= Powder River Examiner =

Newspaper in Broadus, Montana

- Type: Weekly newspaper
- Editor: Billy Stuver
- Founded: 1918 (as the Broadus Independent)
- Language: English
- Headquarters: 119 1/2 N. Park Ave. Broadus, MT 59317; United States
- OCLC number: 11430635
- Website: powderriverexaminer.com

The Powder River Examiner, originally established in October 1918 as the Broadus Independent, is the only newspaper printed in Powder River County, Montana, and is located in the county seat of Broadus.

== History ==
In 1918, the Broadus Independent was first published in Broadus, Montana, but quickly ceased. In March 1919, the paper was relaunched as The Olive Branch in Olive, Montana. In May 1919, J.T. Hamilton sold the Independent to Frank T. Kelsey. A few weeks later, R.L. Linder bought the paper, moved his printing plant from Wibaux to Broadus and renamed the publication to the Powder River County Examiner. The paper was acquired by Mark A. Spooner in October 1919, Hugo Camplin in 1920, John K. Standish in 1925, and Edwin A. Jones in 1926. Jones died of pneumonia in 1937.

The Jones family published the paper for 29 years. In 1955, Dr. Hardie J. Sickles bought the Examiner from Ashton Jones. In 1959, Sickles sold the paper to Aubrey Doyle Larson. Larson acquired other papers, including the Circle Banner, Hysham Echo, Jordan Tribune and Fairview News. In 1977, he sold them all to Louis K. "Ken" Alexander. He sold the chain in 1985. Larson reacquired the paper, who in 1991 was charged with fraud. A federal court claimed he inflated subscription numbers to charge higher advertising rates. Around that time Joe Stuver became editor. In 2019, Larson died. At some point Billy Stuver became editor.

== Titles ==
- Broadus Independent, Broadus, Montana, October 1918 – February 1919.
- Olive Branch, Olive, Montana, March 6, 1919 – April 17, 1919.
- Broadus Independent, Broadus, Montana, April 24, 1919 – 1935.
- Powder River County Examiner, Broadus, Montana, 1935 – 1965.
- Powder River Examiner, Broadus, Montana, 1965 – present
