= Battle of Pumpkin Creek =

U.S. battle against Sioux warriors in Montana

Date	February 7–8, 1880
Location	Powder River County, Montana and Custer County, Montana
Result	United States Victory

Belligerents
United States	Lakota Sioux

Commanders and leaders
(United States) Thaddeus B. Glover (United States) Capt. Simon Snyder	Unknown

Strength
8 soldiers and 7 Indian scouts until arrival of ~50 soldiers	6 warriors

Casualties and losses
1 killed, 1 wounded	2 killed, 2 wounded, 4 captured

The Battle of Pumpkin Creek, also known as the Volborg fight, was fought February 7–8, 1880, by United States Soldiers, and Scouts, against Sioux warriors. The Battle occurred near Pumpkin Creek, a tributary of Tongue River, in Montana Territory, in present-day Montana, United States.

== Background ==
Early in 1880, the Lakota began warring along the Yellowstone River near Fort Keogh. On February 3, Hunkpapa Lakota fought with Gros Ventres, and 15 Lakota Sioux attacked three hay cutters on the Powder River, killing one, and mortally wounding another. The surviving worker reported the incident to Fort Keogh, and Sergeant Thaddeus B. Glover, Corporal Edwards, Private Charles W. Gurnsey, Private George E. Douglass, and four other soldiers of Company B, 2nd United States Cavalry Regiment, and seven Indian scouts were ordered out on February 5, in search of the Lakota responsible.

== The battle ==
On February 7, 1880, after a pursuit of about 65 miles (105 km), the small detachment of 15 soldiers and Indian scouts under Sergeant Glover located a group of six Lakota Sioux Warriors near Pumpkin Creek. The temperature read 56 degrees Fahrenheit below zero. The soldiers and scouts quietly surrounded the warriors who were in a rock formation. Private George E. Douglass exposed himself too far over the edge of a ridge and was immediately spotted by a warrior who fired, killing him instantly. Both sides then fired shots at each other, and one Sioux warrior was killed, and two were wounded. Private Charles W. Gurnsey of Glover's detachment was wounded. The engagement was decided when Company F, of the 5th United States Infantry Regiment under the command of Captain Simon Snyder arrived the next morning from Fort Keogh. With the now much larger force of over sixty United States soldiers, the four remaining Lakota warriors surrendered. The action as recalled by Sergeant Glover:

We had been creeping and floundering through the drifts for some time, keeping as quiet as possible and taking every precaution to screen ourselves from the watchful eyes of the Indians in the hollow below. Suddenly a shot rang out, sharp and clear in the desert stillness. A private in the troop, in the other wing, had pushed too far forward in his eagerness to get a shot, and exposed his body to view over the snow-covered ridge for an instant. A puff of smoke from the camp below, followed by the crack of a rifle, and Private Douglass pitched forward over the ridge, shot through the head. Further concealment was useless and both divisions of the little command opened fire simultaneously. I stationed my men on all the elevated points about the rude fortifications the Indians had hurriedly thrown up. We kept up a heavy fire until dark, when I saw that such methods would prove futile. The Indians were too securely entrenched; they must be either shelled or starved out. Under cover of darkness I sent a courier back to Colonel Miles asking for a Gatling gun, then disposed my men around the hostile camp, forming a chain guard. In that way there could be no reliefs, and during the long hours of that bitter night we suffered intensely. When daylight again straggled slowly over the bleak hills, I examined more carefully the position taken by the hostiles. They were actually inside of a great hollow rock, the most remarkable natural fortification I had ever seen. With provisions, water, and good weather, six men could have held a regiment off for a month. Shortly after I withdrew a part of my force, ordering the rest to keep up a vigorous fire. At that moment, however, a scout rode out to me, and reported that the Indians wished to surrender. I knew that some change of conditions, which had so far escaped us, must have forced the hostiles to this decision. Glancing over the dazzling horizon I saw, far to the west, mere specks on the waste of snow, a body of horsemen approaching. I determined to postpone the surrender of the Indians until the identity of the riders should reveal itself. On they came, their horses throwing up clouds of snow as they galloped toward us. Could they be hostiles? No; the sharp eyes of the Indians had seen them first, and they were willing to give up a practically impregnable position. Finally we saw them rise in their stirrups, and a cheer—a very faint one, but no less a good trooper cheer—came down on the wind. We leaped to our feet and cheered back. It was Captain Snyder, now Colonel Snyder, with re-enforcements. After acquainting himself with the situation, Captain Snyder ordered me to accept the surrender of the hostiles, and with them that night we returned to the post."

— Sergeant Thaddeus B. Glover, after 1881

== Medal of honor ==
One Congressional Medal of Honor was awarded for actions during the battle. It was for:

- Sergeant Thaddeus B. Glover, Company B, 2nd United States Cavalry Regiment.

== The battlefield ==
The Pumpkin Creek Battlefield is at an unknown location near Pumpkin Creek in Powder River County, Montana, or Custer County, Montana. The nearest present-day unincorporated community to the battlefield is Volborg, Montana, and the nearest present-day towns are Broadus, Montana, and Miles City, Montana.

== Order of battle ==
United States Army, Sergeant Thaddeus Brown Glover, Captain Simon Snyder, commanding.

- 2nd United States Cavalry Regiment, Companies B and E (Detachment: 8 men)
  - Sergeant Thaddeus Brown Glover
  - Corporal Edwards
  - Private George E. Douglass (killed in action)
  - Private Charles W. Gurnsey (severely wounded)
  - Four unidentified soldiers
- 5th United States Infantry Regiment, Company F, Captain Simon Snyder.
- 7 Indian scouts

Native Americans

- 6 Lakota Sioux warriors.
