= Epsie, Montana =

Unincorporated community in Montana, US

Epsie
- Unincorporated community
- Location within the state of Montana
- Coordinates: 45°29′30″N 105°39′04″W
- Country: United States
- State: Montana
- County: Powder River
- Established: 1918
- Elevation: 3,363 ft (1,025 m)
- Time zone: Mountain (MST)
  - Summer (DST): MDT
- Area code: 406
- GNIS feature ID: 771234

Epsie is an unincorporated community in Powder River County, Montana, United States. It lies along U.S. Highway 212, 12.7 miles (20.4 km) west of the town of Broadus, the county seat of Powder River County.

== Geography ==
Epsie is located in the Mountain Time Zone (MST/MDT), observes Daylight saving time, lies within the 406 area code, and in the 59346 zip code.

== Climate ==
According to the Köppen Climate Classification system, Epsie has a semi-arid climate, abbreviated "BSk" on climate maps.

== History ==
In May 1908, Epsie McAllister and her daughter Mildred traveled by train and horse from Oregon to Broadus, Montana to join her husband William. He had started the F. E. ranch in Custer County, Montana about 13 miles east of Broadus at the head of Mizpah Creek with his brothers. In 1918, when a post office was designated, it was named Epsie in honor of Epsie McAllister. In 1919, the townsite became part of the newly created Powder River County, with the town of Broadus as the county seat. The first post office operated for 19 years until 1937, then was moved a few miles north to Highway 212. Epsie had a number of buildings including a store. In 1939, Frank Peterson became the postmaster. In 1940, neighbors found him outside of his house that was on fire, with a mortal gunshot wound. The post office is now closed, and is the only standing remaining building at Epsie.
