= Sonnette, Montana =

Unincorporated community in Montana, United States

Sonnette
- Unincorporated community
- Location within the state of Montana
- Coordinates: 45°24′47″N 105°49′53″W
- Country: United States
- State: Montana
- County: Powder River
- Elevation: 3,767 ft (1,148 m)
- Time zone: UTC-7 (Mountain (MST))
  - Summer (DST): UTC-6 (MDT)
- GNIS feature ID: 790852

Sonnette is an unincorporated community in west central Powder River County, Montana, United States. The community is situated near the headwaters of Pumpkin Creek, just west of the Custer National Forest. It lies along local roads northwest of the town of Broadus, the county seat of Powder River County.

== Climate ==
According to the Köppen Climate Classification system, Sonnette has a semi-arid climate, abbreviated "BSk" on climate maps.

Climate data for Sonnette, Montana, 1991–2020 normals, extremes 1965–present
| Month | Jan | Feb | Mar | Apr | May | Jun | Jul | Aug | Sep | Oct | Nov | Dec | Year |
|---|---|---|---|---|---|---|---|---|---|---|---|---|---|
| Record high °F (°C) | 68 (20) | 70 (21) | 80 (27) | 87 (31) | 103 (39) | 105 (41) | 107 (42) | 103 (39) | 100 (38) | 91 (33) | 77 (25) | 71 (22) | 107 (42) |
| Mean maximum °F (°C) | 54.2 (12.3) | 56.5 (13.6) | 68.7 (20.4) | 77.4 (25.2) | 83.9 (28.8) | 91.3 (32.9) | 98.0 (36.7) | 96.8 (36.0) | 92.9 (33.8) | 81.1 (27.3) | 66.1 (18.9) | 54.3 (12.4) | 99.3 (37.4) |
| Mean daily maximum °F (°C) | 36.8 (2.7) | 38.7 (3.7) | 48.8 (9.3) | 57.3 (14.1) | 66.6 (19.2) | 76.5 (24.7) | 86.5 (30.3) | 85.9 (29.9) | 75.3 (24.1) | 59.6 (15.3) | 46.5 (8.1) | 36.8 (2.7) | 59.6 (15.3) |
| Daily mean °F (°C) | 23.2 (−4.9) | 25.0 (−3.9) | 34.7 (1.5) | 43.0 (6.1) | 52.3 (11.3) | 61.7 (16.5) | 69.7 (20.9) | 68.5 (20.3) | 58.5 (14.7) | 44.8 (7.1) | 32.5 (0.3) | 23.6 (−4.7) | 44.8 (7.1) |
| Mean daily minimum °F (°C) | 9.5 (−12.5) | 11.3 (−11.5) | 20.6 (−6.3) | 28.8 (−1.8) | 38.1 (3.4) | 46.8 (8.2) | 53.0 (11.7) | 51.1 (10.6) | 41.7 (5.4) | 30.0 (−1.1) | 18.4 (−7.6) | 10.4 (−12.0) | 30.0 (−1.1) |
| Mean minimum °F (°C) | −17.4 (−27.4) | −14.4 (−25.8) | −3.5 (−19.7) | 10.3 (−12.1) | 21.6 (−5.8) | 34.0 (1.1) | 41.6 (5.3) | 37.8 (3.2) | 26.7 (−2.9) | 9.9 (−12.3) | −4.7 (−20.4) | −13.2 (−25.1) | −25.7 (−32.1) |
| Record low °F (°C) | −38 (−39) | −42 (−41) | −33 (−36) | −8 (−22) | 11 (−12) | 26 (−3) | 33 (1) | 25 (−4) | 10 (−12) | −16 (−27) | −25 (−32) | −44 (−42) | −44 (−42) |
| Average precipitation inches (mm) | 0.50 (13) | 0.70 (18) | 0.91 (23) | 1.85 (47) | 2.95 (75) | 2.69 (68) | 1.67 (42) | 1.10 (28) | 1.09 (28) | 1.38 (35) | 0.56 (14) | 0.51 (13) | 15.91 (404) |
| Average snowfall inches (cm) | 3.9 (9.9) | 6.6 (17) | 5.0 (13) | 3.4 (8.6) | 0.2 (0.51) | 0.0 (0.0) | 0.0 (0.0) | 0.0 (0.0) | 0.0 (0.0) | 1.3 (3.3) | 3.1 (7.9) | 5.6 (14) | 29.1 (74.21) |
| Average precipitation days (≥ 0.01 in) | 3.8 | 5.6 | 4.9 | 7.3 | 8.7 | 7.9 | 6.5 | 5.1 | 4.6 | 5.8 | 3.8 | 3.6 | 67.6 |
| Average snowy days (≥ 0.1 in) | 1.9 | 2.4 | 1.3 | 1.0 | 0.1 | 0.0 | 0.0 | 0.0 | 0.0 | 0.8 | 1.3 | 2.0 | 10.8 |
Source 1: NOAA
Source 2: National Weather Service
