= Hammond, Montana =

Unincorporated community in Montana, United States

- Unincorporated community
- Interactive map of Hammond, Montana
- Coordinates: 45°13′32″N 104°55′05″W
- Country: United States
- State: Montana
- County: Carter
- Elevation: 3,711 ft (1,131 m)
- Time zone: Mountain (MST)
  - Summer (DST): MDT
- ZIP code: 59332
- Area code: 406
- GNIS feature ID: 772106

Hammond is an unincorporated community in Carter County, Montana, United States. It is located approximately 30 miles (48 km) southeast of the town of Broadus along U.S. Highway 212. Its elevation is 3,711 feet.

== History ==
The town began with a store and gas station during the construction of US 212 in the 1930s. In the 21st century, Hammond has consisted only of an active post office and a rancher's home. Three other buildings along the highway are abandoned and deteriorated beyond use. Hammond is located in the southeast corner of the state, near the Montana-Wyoming border between the unincorporated communities of Boyes and Alzada in Carter County. Hammond is 61 miles (98 km) southwest of the Carter County seat, Ekalaka. The area around Hammond is mostly ranchland.

== Climate ==
According to the Köppen Climate Classification system, Hammond has a semi-arid climate, abbreviated "BSk" on climate maps.
