= Jess Lockwood =

Jess Lockwood may refer to:

- Jess Lockwood (Home and Away), a character from the Australian soap opera Home and Away
- Jess Lockwood (bull rider) (born 1997), professional bull rider
