= Otter, Montana =

Unincorporated community in Montana, United States

Otter
- Unincorporated community
- Location within the state of Montana
- Coordinates: 45°12′28″N 106°12′6″W
- Country: United States
- State: Montana
- County: Powder River
- Elevation: 3,484 ft (1,062 m)
- Time zone: UTC-7 (Mountain (MST))
  - Summer (DST): UTC-6 (MDT)
- ZIP codes: 59062
- GNIS feature ID: 788508

Otter is an unincorporated community in southwestern Powder River County, Montana, United States, in the Custer National Forest. It lies along local roads southwest of the town of Broadus, the county seat of Powder River County. Its elevation is 3,484 feet (1,062 m). Although Otter is unincorporated, it has a post office, with the ZIP code of 59062.

== Climate ==
According to the Köppen Climate Classification system, Otter has a semi-arid climate, abbreviated "BSk" on climate maps.

== History ==
The Community of Otter was named for Otter Creek. The town post office (opened in 1895) is located within a mile of its head. Otter Creek was named by fur traders and trappers in the early days of Montana's history. In 1897, area cattle rancher Levi Howes established the civilian redoubt Fort Howes in response to an anticipated attack by the Northern Cheyenne. In 1900, a sheep raid led by future Wyoming Governor and US Senator John B. Kendrick resulted in over 2,000 sheep being killed. Kendrick's participation in the raid was unconfirmed until 1974.

== See also ==
- Fort Howes
