= Mill Iron, Montana =

Unincorporated community in Montana, United States

- Unincorporated community
- Location within Montana Location within the United States
- Coordinates: 45°51′13″N 104°13′10″W
- Country: United States
- State: Montana
- County: Carter
- Elevation: 3,110 ft (950 m)
- Time zone: UTC-7 (Mountain (MST))
  - Summer (DST): UTC-6 (MDT)
- Area code: 406
- GNIS feature ID: 774229

Mill Iron is an unincorporated community in Carter County, Montana, United States. Mill Iron is 16.2 miles (26.1 km) east of Ekalaka. The community had its own post office until January 1, 1994.

Mill Iron gives its name to a nearby archaeological site (14km to its west) that was first excavated in 1984. The Paleoindian site helped define the Goshen Complex, a related projectile point to the Plainview Complex.
