= Thaddeus B. Glover =

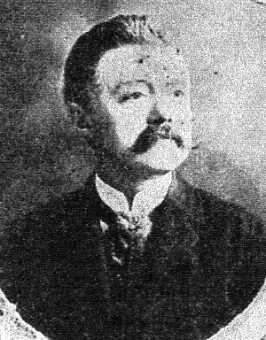
- Thaddeus Brown Glover
- Born: January 2, 1852; New York City, United States
- Died: December 18, 1932 (aged 80); New York, United States
- Burial place: Willow Hill Cemetery, Southold, New York, United States
- Military career
- Allegiance: United States
- Branch: United States Army
- Service years: 1876 – 1881, 1917 – 1919
- Rank: Major
- Unit: 2nd Cavalry Regiment
- Conflicts: Indian Wars: Mizpah Creek Incidents; Battle of Pumpkin Creek
- Awards: Medal of Honor

Thaddeus Brown Glover (1852–1932) was a United States Army officer who received the Medal of Honor. His award came for gallantry during the American Indian Wars.

== Life ==
Glover was born on January 2, 1852, and joined the United States Army in March 1876. Glover was assigned to Company B, of the 2nd Cavalry Regiment. Glover was awarded the Medal of Honor for his actions, on the dates of April 10, 1879, and February 10, 1880. He left the Army in March 1881, and later served as a Major in the Quartermaster Corps from January 1917 to October 1919.

Thaddeus Brown Glover died on December 18, 1932. He is buried at the Willow Hill Cemetery in Southold, Suffolk County, New York, United States.

== Medal of Honor citation ==
In the name of Congress, the President of the United States of America takes pleasure in presenting the Medal of Honor to Sergeant Thaddeus Brown Glover, United States Army, for extraordinary heroism.

Rank and organization: Sergeant, Company B, 2nd United States Cavalry Regiment. Place and date: At Mizpah Creek, Montana, and Pumpkin Creek, Montana, April 10, 1879, and February 10, 1880. Entered service at: United States. Born: January 2, 1852. Date of issue: November 20, 1897.

Citation: "While in charge of small scouting parties, fought, charged, surrounded, and captured war parties of Sioux Indians".

== See also ==
- 2nd United States Cavalry Regiment
- List of Medal of Honor recipients for the Indian Wars
