= Moorhead, Montana =

Unincorporated community in Montana, United States

Moorhead
- Unincorporated community
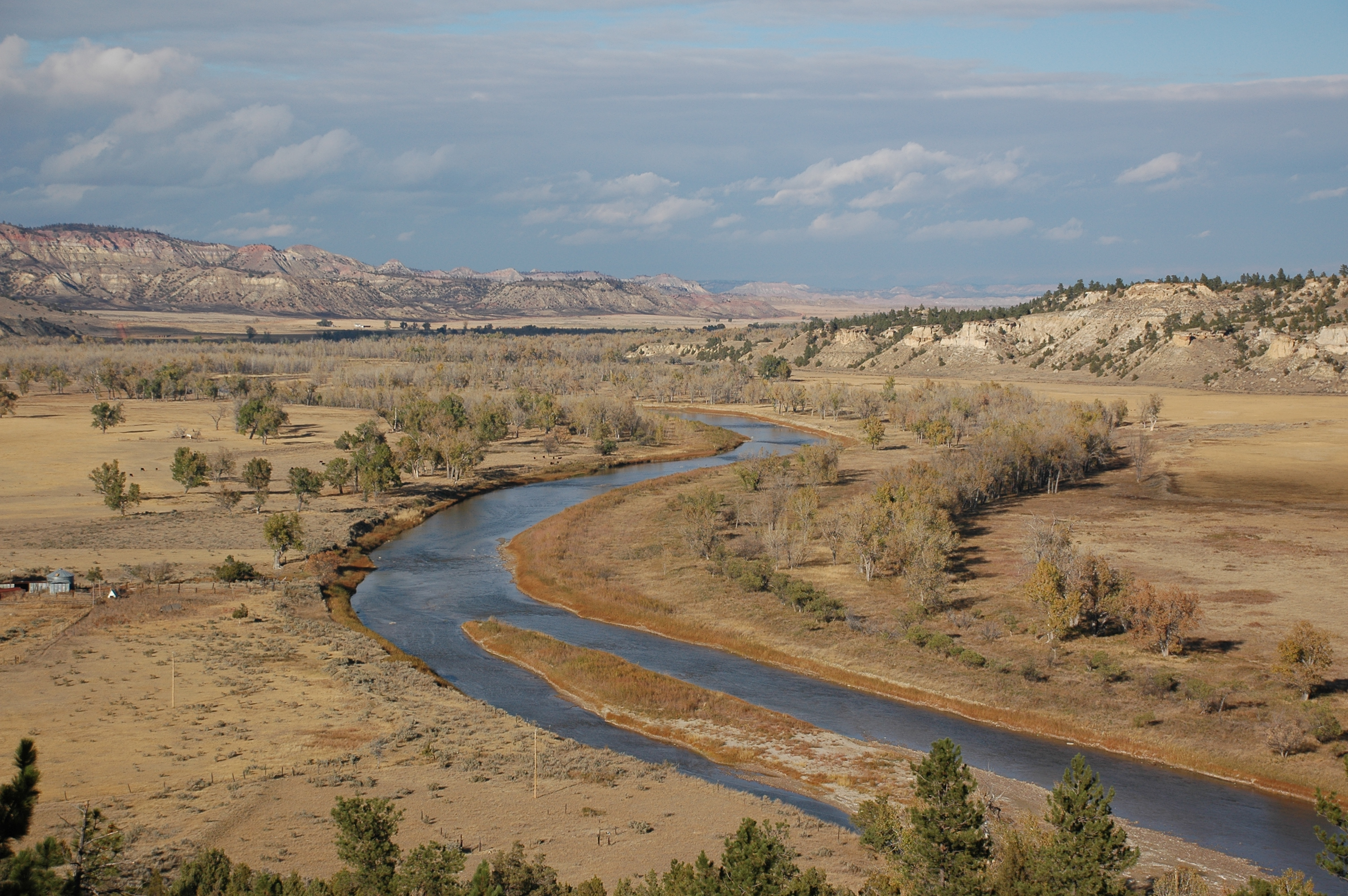
- The Powder River less than 2 miles (3.2 km) north of Moorhead.

- Location within the state of Montana
- Coordinates: 45°03′54″N 105°52′16″W
- Country: United States
- State: Montana
- County: Powder River
- Established: 1892
- Elevation: 3,347 ft (1,020 m)

Population (2014)
  - Total: 1
- Time zone: Mountain (MST)
  - Summer (DST): MDT
- GNIS feature ID: 774368

Moorhead is an unincorporated community in southern Powder River County, Montana, United States. It lies along Moorhead Road, approximately 35 miles (56 km) south of the town of Broadus, the county seat of Powder River County.

== Climate ==
According to the Köppen Climate Classification system, Moorhead has a semi-arid climate, abbreviated "BSk" on climate maps.

Climate data for Moorhead, Montana, 1991–2020 normals, extremes 1958–present
Month	Jan	Feb	Mar	Apr	May	Jun	Jul	Aug	Sep	Oct	Nov	Dec	Year
Record high °F (°C)	66 (19)	73 (23)	84 (29)	89 (32)	97 (36)	109 (43)	109 (43)	107 (42)	105 (41)	95 (35)	78 (26)	71 (22)	109 (43)
Mean maximum °F (°C)	54.5 (12.5)	57.8 (14.3)	73.0 (22.8)	80.0 (26.7)	87.7 (30.9)	96.1 (35.6)	102.5 (39.2)	100.4 (38.0)	96.1 (35.6)	84.1 (28.9)	67.8 (19.9)	55.0 (12.8)	103.5 (39.7)
Mean daily maximum °F (°C)	34.7 (1.5)	38.4 (3.6)	49.9 (9.9)	58.6 (14.8)	68.0 (20.0)	78.5 (25.8)	88.5 (31.4)	87.3 (30.7)	76.6 (24.8)	60.5 (15.8)	45.7 (7.6)	35.4 (1.9)	60.2 (15.7)
Daily mean °F (°C)	23.1 (−4.9)	26.3 (−3.2)	36.4 (2.4)	44.9 (7.2)	54.2 (12.3)	64.0 (17.8)	71.9 (22.2)	70.1 (21.2)	60.0 (15.6)	46.4 (8.0)	33.6 (0.9)	24.1 (−4.4)	46.3 (7.9)
Mean daily minimum °F (°C)	11.5 (−11.4)	14.2 (−9.9)	22.9 (−5.1)	31.2 (−0.4)	40.5 (4.7)	49.6 (9.8)	55.3 (12.9)	52.8 (11.6)	43.4 (6.3)	32.4 (0.2)	21.5 (−5.8)	12.7 (−10.7)	32.3 (0.2)
Mean minimum °F (°C)	−15.0 (−26.1)	−10.2 (−23.4)	2.0 (−16.7)	15.3 (−9.3)	25.9 (−3.4)	37.8 (3.2)	45.1 (7.3)	41.0 (5.0)	29.5 (−1.4)	14.7 (−9.6)	−0.3 (−17.9)	−9.8 (−23.2)	−22.0 (−30.0)
Record low °F (°C)	−37 (−38)	−40 (−40)	−27 (−33)	−3 (−19)	14 (−10)	27 (−3)	34 (1)	27 (−3)	9 (−13)	−13 (−25)	−32 (−36)	−48 (−44)	−48 (−44)
Average precipitation inches (mm)	0.30 (7.6)	0.39 (9.9)	0.70 (18)	1.43 (36)	2.59 (66)	2.17 (55)	1.41 (36)	1.25 (32)	1.05 (27)	1.11 (28)	0.37 (9.4)	0.29 (7.4)	13.06 (332.3)
Average snowfall inches (cm)	5.4 (14)	4.7 (12)	4.6 (12)	3.7 (9.4)	0.5 (1.3)	0.0 (0.0)	0.0 (0.0)	0.0 (0.0)	0.0 (0.0)	2.0 (5.1)	3.3 (8.4)	4.8 (12)	29.0 (74)
Average precipitation days (≥ 0.01 in)	4.8	5.4	5.5	8.2	9.6	9.3	7.1	5.7	5.1	6.2	4.6	4.2	75.7
Average snowy days (≥ 0.1 in)	3.9	3.9	2.4	1.3	0.2	0.0	0.0	0.0	0.0	1.2	1.9	3.7	18.5
Source 1: NOAA
Source 2: National Weather Service

== History ==
=== American Indian Wars ===
On September 13, 1865, Colonel Nelson D. Cole's and Lieutenant Colonel Samuel Walker's columns of the Powder River Expedition marched past the future site of Moorhead. On March 17, 1876, the Battle of Powder River, part of the Great Sioux War of 1876 was fought less than 1/2 mile (0.80 km) to the north, and after the battle, the surviving United States Army soldiers retreated south across the future townsite.

=== The Town ===
Moorhead was established in 1892, in Custer County, and was originally named Franklin. In 1898, Bryon Kelsey changed the name of the town to Moorhead after Annis P. Moorhead, who homesteaded at the town. The first store in Moorhead was established in 1900 by Bryon Kelsey. In 1919, Moorhead became part of the newly created Powder River County, with the town of Broadus as the county seat. The town's post office moved several times. In the 1930s Moorhead's first car bridge over the Powder River was built, although in the spring of 1948 the two-lane bridge was washed out by a flood. By 1949 there was one post office, one store, one schoolhouse (that also served as a church and dance hall), one saloon, and one filling station. At this time, a dam was proposed to be built on the Powder River at Moorhead. But in the 1950s when the Moorhead dam project deteriorated the businesses began to close. In 1956, a footbridge was built across the Powder at Moorhead, and was used to carry mail three times a week. Then in 1972, a second car bridge was built beside the footbridge. Moorhead Rancher George Fulton moved the store and post office to the Fultons' property, one mile north of their original location on the Moorhead road, and placed them near the old Moorhead schoolhouse. His son Hugh now owns these three remaining buildings. In 2019, the current car bridge was deemed unsafe and closed to all traffic.
