= Fort Howes =

- South of Ashland, Powder River County, Montana

Site information
- Type: Redoubt
- Owner: Private property
- Condition: Preserved

Location
- Coordinates: 45°17′00″N 106°08′53″W

Site history
- Built: 1897
- Built by: Civilians
- Materials: Rock, wood
- Demolished: 1897 (decommissioned)

Garrison information
- Past commanders: Captain Calvin C. Howes
- Garrison: Civilians

Airfield information
- Elevation: 3,297 feet (1,005 m) AMSL

Fort Howes was a civilian redoubt established in 1897 in what was then Custer County, Montana, United States in response to the murder of a sheepherder. Today the site is within Custer National Forest and is occupied by a Bureau of Land Management Fire Station.

== Location ==
The Fort Howes redoubt is located on private property near County Road 484, also known as Otter Creek Road, in present-day Powder River County, Montana, near the unincorporated community of Otter, Montana and about 20 miles (32 km) south of the present-day census-designated place of Ashland, Montana. It stands at 3,297 feet (1,005 m) above sea level; its coordinates are 45°17′00″N 106°08′53″W.

== History ==
Fort Howes was established in the spring of 1897 by Custer County civilians after a sheepherder named John Hoover, who worked for John Barringer, and his sheep dog were murdered by several Cheyenne warriors between April 28 and May 3, 1897, near the town of Ashland, Montana. After Hoover's body was recovered on May 27, the women and children that lived near Ashland were sent to Sheridan, Wyoming and Miles City, Montana. Men of the Ashland area began building a fortified redoubt on the crest of a hill located on the Howes ranch, along Otter Creek, a tributary of the Tongue River, to discourage further Indian attacks. The walls were built with spaces for rifles to shoot through, and one large opening for men to enter through. Finally there was a wooden plank roof built over the fort. Weapons, ammunition, food, and water were stored inside. At its completion, the walls measured 18 by 10 feet (5.5 by 3.0 m).

The redoubt was named after Captain Calvin C. Howes, who owned the land under the fort. Cowboys and stockmen were posted at the fort as guards, and on multiple occasions in the early summer of 1897 they observed Cheyenne warriors riding nearby and examining the structure. Custer County Sheriff John Gibbs came to the Howes ranch and deputized twelve men, including Levi Howes, the son of Calvin C. Howes. The group was joined by cowboys, and when they numbered about 200 men, rode into Lame Deer, Montana to apprehend the Cheyenne warriors that had killed John Hoover. A contingent of U.S. Army soldiers from nearby Fort Keogh also traveled to Lame Deer to keep the peace. After discussing the situation with the Cheyenne through interpreters, the guilty Cheyenne warriors were turned over to Sheriff Gibbs and his deputies, and later released. The anticipated "Indian uprising" did not take place, and the redoubt was abandoned in the summer of 1897.

== Fort Howes today ==
The rock walls are present at the original location and as of 2020 have been standing for 123 years, although the original roof has been replaced. A U.S. Forest Service Ranger Station was built just north of the site in 1936 and was replaced by a Bureau of Land Management Fire Station in 2014, equipped with a helitack office and hangar, three helipads suitable for Type II helicopters, offices, and a barracks with laundry facilities. The station is staffed by BLM fire operations personnel and three Type 6 engines, which have direct fire suppression responsibility for BLM, USFS, and private affidavit lands within Custer National Forest in Powder River County and portions of Custer, Rosebud, and Big Horn counties.

== See also ==
- List of military installations in Montana
