= Olive, Montana =

Unincorporated community in Montana, United States

Olive
- Unincorporated community
- Location within the state of Montana
- Coordinates: 45°33′2″N 105°31′41″W
- Country: United States
- State: Montana
- County: Powder River
- Elevation: 3,232 ft (985 m)
- Time zone: UTC-7 (Mountain (MST))
  - Summer (DST): UTC-6 (MDT)
- ZIP codes: 59343
- GNIS feature ID: 774953

Olive (also Rocky Point) is an unincorporated community in north central Powder River County, Montana, United States. It lies along Highway 59 northwest of the town of Broadus, the county seat of Powder River County. Its elevation is 3,232 feet (985 m).

The post office opened in 1909. It is now closed.
