= Coalwood, Montana =

Unincorporated community in Montana, United States

Coalwood
- Unincorporated community
- Location within the state of Montana
- Coordinates: 45°43′41″N 105°35′26″W
- Country: United States
- State: Montana
- County: Powder River
- Established: 1910
- Elevation: 3,347 ft (1,020 m)
- Time zone: Mountain (MST)
  - Summer (DST): MDT
- Area code: 406
- GNIS feature ID: 770001

Coalwood is an unincorporated community in northern Powder River County, Montana, United States. It lies along Montana Highway 59, 23.5 miles (37.8 km) north of the town of Broadus, the county seat of Powder River County.

== Geography ==
Coalwood is located at 3,340 feet (1,018 m) above sea level. The community lies in the Mountain Time Zone (MST/MDT), observes Daylight saving time, and lies within the 406 area code.

== Climate ==
According to the Köppen Climate Classification system, Coalwood has a semi-arid climate, abbreviated "BSk" on climate maps.

== History ==
Coalwood was established in 1910, in Custer County. In 1919, it became part of the newly created Powder River County, with the town of Broadus as the county seat.
