= Powderville, Montana =

Unincorporated community in Montana, United States

Powderville
- Unincorporated community
- Location within the state of Montana
- Coordinates: 45°45′32″N 105°6′55″W
- Country: United States
- State: Montana
- County: Powder River
- Elevation: 2,828 ft (862 m)
- Time zone: UTC-7 (Mountain (MST))
  - Summer (DST): UTC-6 (MDT)
- ZIP codes: 59345
- GNIS feature ID: 775415

Powderville, also Elkhorn Crossing is an unincorporated community in northeastern Powder River County, Montana, United States, along the Powder River. It is a small cluster of buildings that lies along local roads northeast of the town of Broadus, the county seat of Powder River County. Its elevation is 2,828 feet (862 m).

== History ==
Powder River Telegraph Station
- near Powderville, Powder River County, Montana

Site information
- Type: Outpost
- Owner: Private property

Site history
- Built: 1878
- Built by: U.S. Army
- Materials: Wood
- Demolished: 1883 (decommissioned)

Garrison information
- Past commanders: Private Leopold Hohman, Private Shultz
- Garrison: detachments from 5th U.S. Infantry, 2nd U.S. Cavalry

On September 7, 1865, the right and middle columns of the Powder River Expedition crossed the future site of Powderville while traveling south upriver. That evening, the columns camped several miles to the south and buried three soldiers who had died during the day.

The Powder River Telegraph Station was a U.S. Army telegraph repair station that existed from 1878 until 1883 along the Powder River in southeastern Montana Territory. Today the site is within Powder River County.

The Powder River Telegraph Repair Station was established on November 1, 1878 by soldiers of the 9th U.S. Infantry from Camp Devin on the right bank of the Powder River in southeastern Montana Territory, along the Black Hills to Fort Keogh telegraph route. Private Leopold Hohman, of Company E, 5th Infantry was assigned to the station on December 20, 1878, and given command. Privates J. Broderick and L. Smith, also of the 5th Infantry, were transferred to the outpost in early 1879 as repairmen, and the line was opened for communication in April. The opening skirmish of the Mizpah Creek Incidents, in which two U.S. Army telegraph repairmen were shot by Cheyenne warriors, took place nearby on April 5, 1879. By 1881, the outpost was "supplied with a complete set of telegraph instruments and repair tools" and maintained "66 miles of wire" between the sections of the Little Missouri Telegraph Station and that of Fort Keogh. Private Hohman left the station on April 14, 1881, and was honorably discharged that May, but he didn't leave the Powder River without leaving his mark. On a hill now called Soldiers Mount that overlooks the site of the station on the east side of the Powder River, Hohman carved his name, role, company, regiment, and the years he served the station onto a sandstone boulder that can still be read today. Hohman's rock is located about one mile east of the present-day community of Powderville. After Hohman left, Private Shultz of the 2nd Cavalry took over command of the station, and the force was decreased by one man. By the early 1880s, the route of the telegraph line became the Deadwood-Miles City stagecoach road, and in 1885 the civilian community of Powderville was built adjacent to the station. In 1885 it became a stage stop when the Deadwood to Miles City, Montana stagecoach line was established along the route of the telegraph line, crossing the Powder River at Elkhorn Crossing. The Powder River telegraph repair station was decommissioned in 1883, although U.S. Army troops from Fort Keogh continued operating in the area into the 1890s.

Although Powderville is unincorporated, it had a post office with the ZIP code of 59345, from 1885 until 2011.

Powderville has its own Boot Hill Cemetery. It is located on a hill overlooking the old post office.

== Climate ==
According to the Köppen Climate Classification system, Powderville has a semi-arid climate, abbreviated "BSk" on climate maps.

Climate data for Powderville, Montana, 1991–2020 normals, extremes 1964–present
Month	Jan	Feb	Mar	Apr	May	Jun	Jul	Aug	Sep	Oct	Nov	Dec	Year
Record high °F (°C)	68 (20)	71 (22)	84 (29)	91 (33)	102 (39)	110 (43)	110 (43)	109 (43)	105 (41)	97 (36)	79 (26)	70 (21)	110 (43)
Mean maximum °F (°C)	52.5 (11.4)	56.6 (13.7)	71.6 (22.0)	80.6 (27.0)	87.8 (31.0)	95.4 (35.2)	102.0 (38.9)	100.5 (38.1)	96.3 (35.7)	83.5 (28.6)	68.4 (20.2)	54.2 (12.3)	103.5 (39.7)
Mean daily maximum °F (°C)	32.4 (0.2)	36.4 (2.4)	48.5 (9.2)	59.4 (15.2)	69.5 (20.8)	79.7 (26.5)	90.0 (32.2)	89.1 (31.7)	77.6 (25.3)	60.6 (15.9)	45.7 (7.6)	34.8 (1.6)	60.3 (15.7)
Daily mean °F (°C)	21.3 (−5.9)	25.1 (−3.8)	35.8 (2.1)	46.2 (7.9)	56.3 (13.5)	66.0 (18.9)	74.4 (23.6)	72.9 (22.7)	61.8 (16.6)	47.2 (8.4)	33.5 (0.8)	23.5 (−4.7)	47.0 (8.3)
Mean daily minimum °F (°C)	10.1 (−12.2)	13.7 (−10.2)	23.1 (−4.9)	33.0 (0.6)	43.1 (6.2)	52.4 (11.3)	58.9 (14.9)	56.6 (13.7)	46.0 (7.8)	33.8 (1.0)	21.4 (−5.9)	12.1 (−11.1)	33.7 (0.9)
Mean minimum °F (°C)	−19.1 (−28.4)	−13.9 (−25.5)	−3.5 (−19.7)	13.1 (−10.5)	25.4 (−3.7)	38.1 (3.4)	45.6 (7.6)	40.3 (4.6)	28.2 (−2.1)	12.2 (−11.0)	−3.1 (−19.5)	−14.2 (−25.7)	−27.2 (−32.9)
Record low °F (°C)	−38 (−39)	−39 (−39)	−34 (−37)	−7 (−22)	12 (−11)	20 (−7)	25 (−4)	27 (−3)	11 (−12)	−13 (−25)	−28 (−33)	−45 (−43)	−45 (−43)
Average precipitation inches (mm)	0.43 (11)	0.51 (13)	0.74 (19)	1.64 (42)	2.84 (72)	2.68 (68)	1.72 (44)	1.23 (31)	1.25 (32)	1.16 (29)	0.47 (12)	0.35 (8.9)	15.02 (381.9)
Average snowfall inches (cm)	5.4 (14)	5.8 (15)	5.1 (13)	2.6 (6.6)	1.1 (2.8)	0.0 (0.0)	0.0 (0.0)	0.0 (0.0)	0.0 (0.0)	1.7 (4.3)	3.3 (8.4)	4.9 (12)	29.9 (76.1)
Average precipitation days (≥ 0.01 in)	5.9	6.1	6.3	8.5	10.1	9.9	7.1	5.4	5.5	6.7	5.2	4.7	81.4
Average snowy days (≥ 0.1 in)	4.5	4.2	3.0	1.5	0.2	0.0	0.0	0.0	0.0	0.8	2.4	3.6	20.2
Source 1: NOAA
Source 2: National Weather Service

== See also ==
- List of military installations in Montana
