= List of battles fought in Ohio =

This is an incomplete list of military confrontations that have occurred within the boundaries of the modern US State of Ohio since European contact. The region was part of New France from 1679–1763, ruled by Great Britain from 1763–1783, and part of the United States of America 1783–present.

Several wars that have directly affected the region including the French and Indian War (1754–1763), American Revolutionary War (1775–1783), Northwest Indian War (1785–1795), Tecumseh's War (1811–1812), War of 1812 (1812–1814), and the American Civil War (1860–1865).

== Battles ==
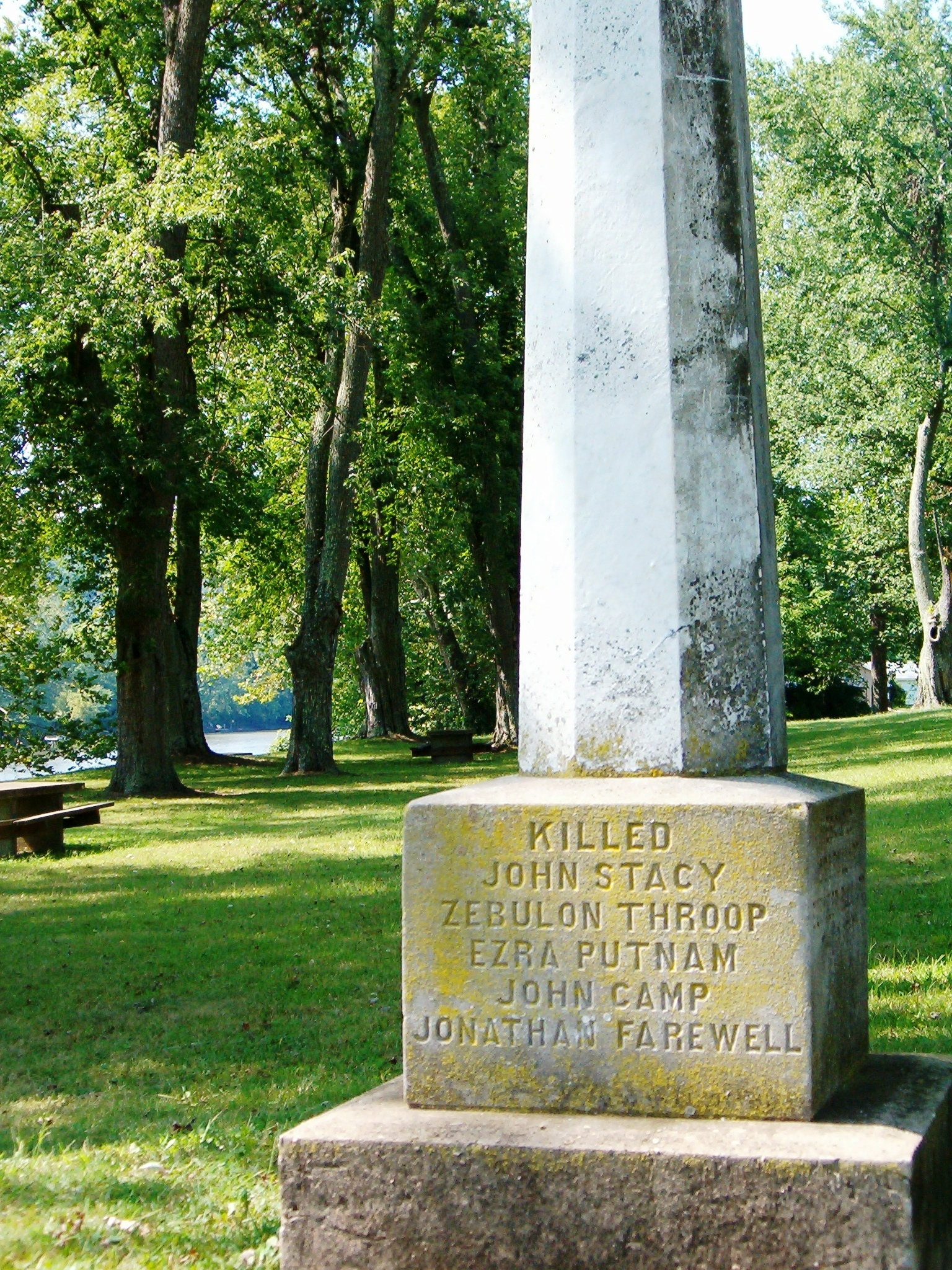
Monument at the site of the Big Bottom massacre

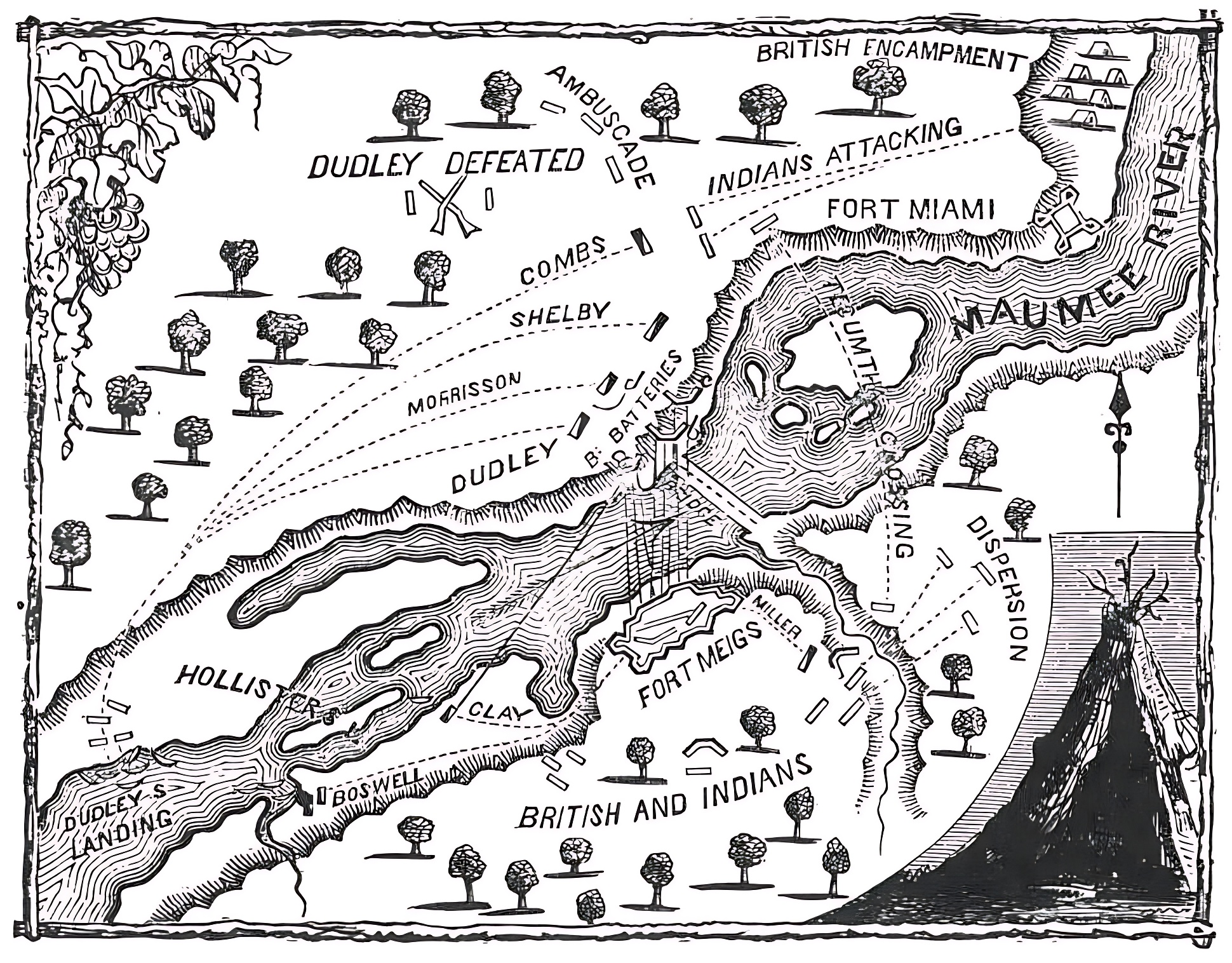
Plan of the Battle of Fort Meigs, 5 May, from Benson J. Lossing's Pictorial Field Book of the War of 1812

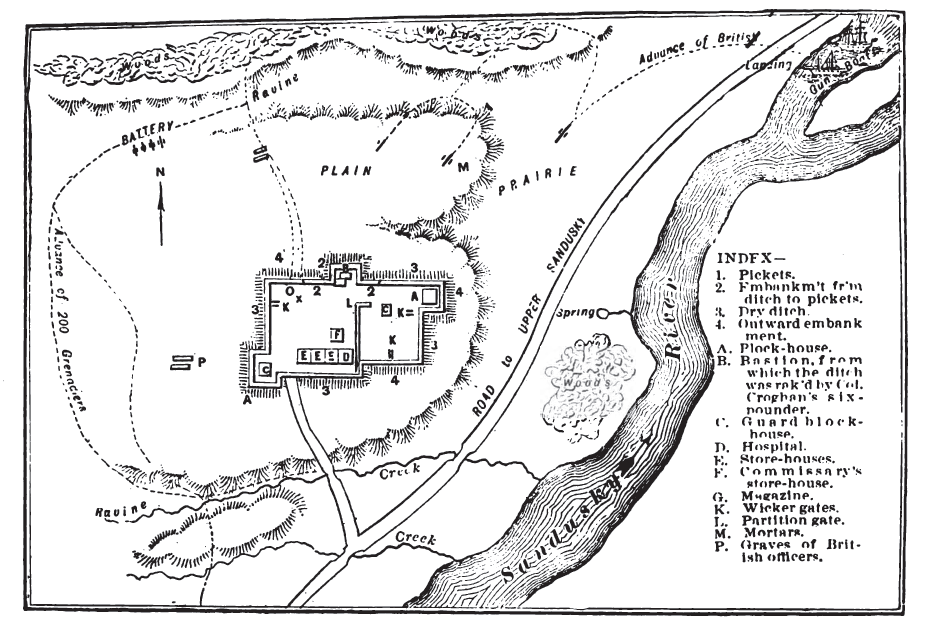
Battle of Fort Stephenson depicted in 1912 history book

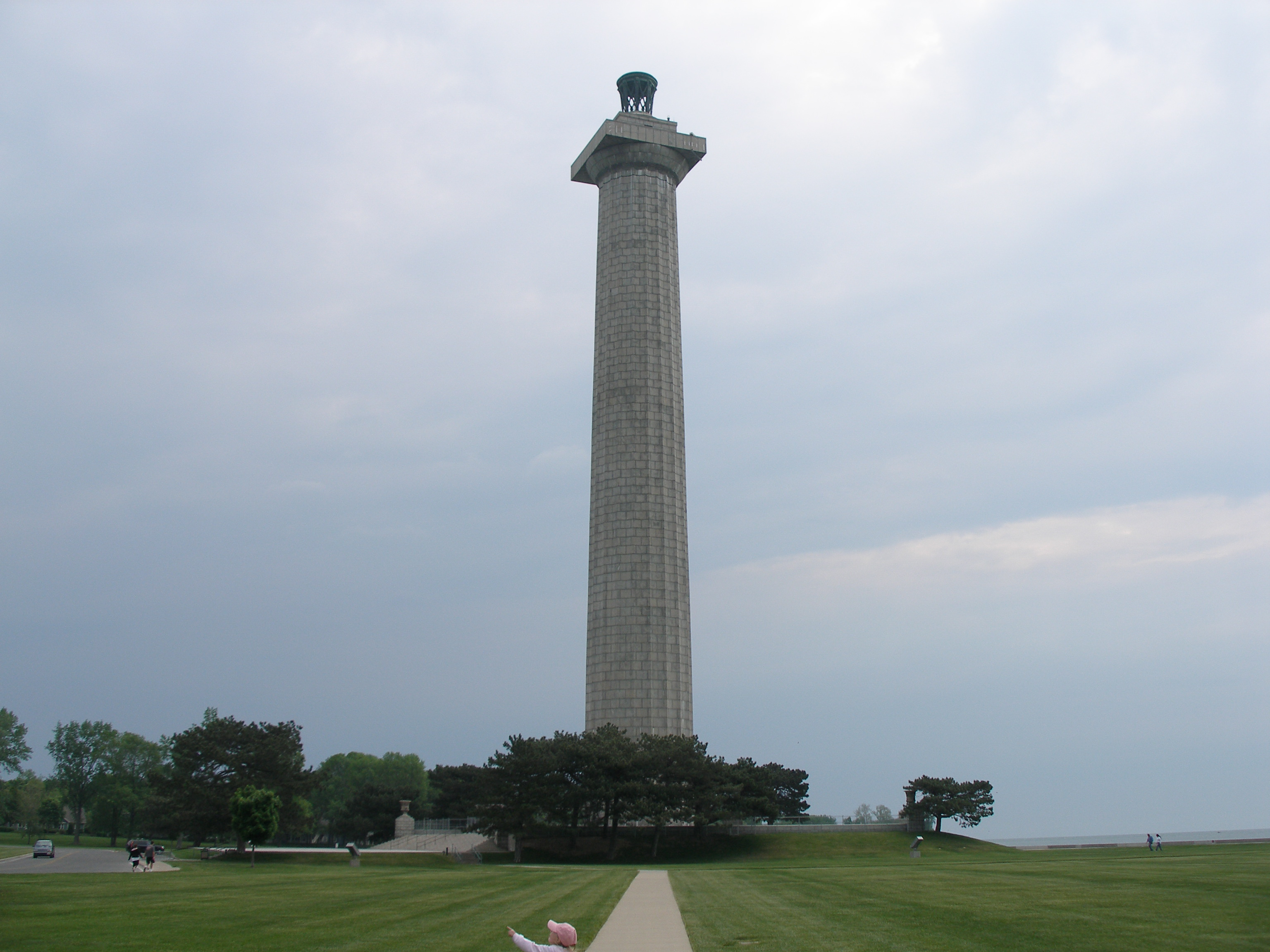
Perry's Victory and International Peace Memorial

Name	Date	Location	War	Campaign	Dead	Belligerents
Fort Sandusky	May 16, 1763	disputed	Pontiac's Rebellion		15+	Wyandot vs. Great Britain
Siege of Fort Laurens	February 22 - March 20, 1779	near modern Bolivar, Ohio	American Revolutionary War	Western theater	17+	Great Britain & Native allies vs. United States
Battle of Chillicothe	May 1779	present-day Xenia Township, Greene County, Ohio	American Revolutionary War	Western theater	unknown	Kentucky militia vs. Shawnee
Battle of Piqua	August 8, 1780	Bethel Township, Clark County, Ohio	American Revolutionary War	Western theater	50+	United States vs. Shawnee and allies
Gnadenhutten massacre	March 8, 1782	Gnadenhutten, Ohio	American Revolutionary War	Western theater	96	Pennsylvania militia vs. Christian Lenape
Logan's Raid	October 1786	near modern Springfield, Ohio	Northwest Indian War		11	Shawnee vs. Kentucky militia
Big Bottom massacre	January 2, 1791	near modern Stockport, Ohio	Northwest Indian War		12	Lenape & Wyandot vs. Ohio settlers
Siege of Dunlap's Station	January 8–11, 1791	near modern Dunlap, Ohio	Northwest Indian War		2	Native Americans vs. Ohio settlers
St. Clair's Defeat	November 4, 1791	near modern Fort Recovery, Ohio	Northwest Indian War		893+	Western Confederacy vs. United States
Attack on Fort St. Clair	November 9, 1792	modern Preble County	Northwest Indian War		10+	Miami vs. Kentucky militia
Siege of Fort Recovery	June 30-July 1, 1794	modern Fort Recovery, Ohio	Northwest Indian War		43+	Western Confederacy vs. United States
Battle of Fallen Timbers	August 20, 1794	near modern Maumee, Ohio	Northwest Indian War		77	Western Confederacy vs. United States
Battle of Marblehead Peninsula	September 29, 1812	modern Marblehead, Ohio	War of 1812		48	Tecumseh's confederacy vs. United States citizens
Siege of Fort Meigs	April 28 – May 9, 1813	modern Perrysburg, Ohio	War of 1812		174+	United Kingdom & Native Americans vs. United States
Battle of Fort Stephenson	August 2, 1813	modern Sandusky County, Ohio	War of 1812		27	United Kingdom & Tecumseh's confederacy vs. United States
Battle of Put-in-Bay	September 10, 1813	Lake Erie near modern Put-in-Bay, Ohio	War of 1812		68	United Kingdom vs. United States
Battle of Buffington Island	July 19, 1863	Portland, Ohio / Buffington Island	American Civil War	Morgan's Raid (1863)	77	United States vs. Confederate States of America
Battle of Salineville	July 26, 1863	near Salineville, Ohio	American Civil War	Morgan's Raid (1863)		United States vs. Confederate States of America
Cincinnati Courthouse riots	March 28–30, 1884	Cincinnati, Ohio		Protest of a jury case	56	Citizen mob vs. Cincinnati Police, 1st Ohio Militia, Dayton militia & Columbus militia

== See also ==
- History of Ohio
- Ohio in the American Civil War
