= Biddle, Montana =

Biddle
- census-designated place
- Location within the state of Montana
- Coordinates: 45°06′18″N 105°48′42″W
- Country: United States
- State: Montana
- County: Powder River

Area
  - Total: 17.12 sq mi (44.34 km^{2})
  - Land: 17.12 sq mi (44.34 km^{2})
  - Water: 0 sq mi (0.00 km^{2})
- Elevation: 3,389 ft (1,033 m)

Population (2020)
  - Total: 28
  - Density: 1.6/sq mi (0.63/km^{2})
- Time zone: UTC-7 (Mountain (MST))
  - Summer (DST): UTC-6 (MDT)
- ZIP code: 59314
- FIPS code: 30-05650
- GNIS feature ID: 2583790

Biddle is a village in southeastern Powder River County, Montana, United States, near the Little Powder River. It lies along Highway 59, south of the town of Broadus, the county seat of Powder River County. As of the 2020 census, Biddle had a population of 28.

The post office was established in 1916 with Charles Schofield as postmaster. It was later taken over by Roland Rumph and in 2010 the post office was built and is currently ran by USPS. The town's name came from S. F. B. Biddle, former owner of the large Cross Ranch, now currently owned by Nathan and Connie Rumph.

== Demographics ==
Historical population
Census	Pop.	Note	%±
2020	28		—
U.S. Decennial Census

As of 2020, the estimated population of Biddle is 28. The median age for a person living in Biddle is 49. The average number of persons per household is 2.29. The median household income is $24,167.

== Climate ==
According to the Köppen Climate Classification system, Biddle has a semi-arid climate, abbreviated "BSk" on climate maps.

Climate data for Biddle, Montana (elev 3631 feet), 1991–2020 normals, extremes 1963–present
Month	Jan	Feb	Mar	Apr	May	Jun	Jul	Aug	Sep	Oct	Nov	Dec	Year
Record high °F (°C)	69 (21)	72 (22)	81 (27)	90 (32)	98 (37)	109 (43)	110 (43)	107 (42)	104 (40)	93 (34)	79 (26)	70 (21)	110 (43)
Mean maximum °F (°C)	54.6 (12.6)	56.9 (13.8)	71.0 (21.7)	78.6 (25.9)	85.8 (29.9)	94.7 (34.8)	101.5 (38.6)	99.7 (37.6)	95.8 (35.4)	82.8 (28.2)	68.5 (20.3)	55.7 (13.2)	102.8 (39.3)
Mean daily maximum °F (°C)	36.8 (2.7)	38.9 (3.8)	49.9 (9.9)	58.5 (14.7)	68.2 (20.1)	78.9 (26.1)	89.4 (31.9)	88.3 (31.3)	77.8 (25.4)	61.2 (16.2)	48.0 (8.9)	37.2 (2.9)	61.1 (16.2)
Daily mean °F (°C)	24.9 (−3.9)	27.1 (−2.7)	36.8 (2.7)	45.0 (7.2)	54.6 (12.6)	64.6 (18.1)	73.2 (22.9)	71.8 (22.1)	61.8 (16.6)	47.5 (8.6)	35.3 (1.8)	25.8 (−3.4)	47.4 (8.5)
Mean daily minimum °F (°C)	13.1 (−10.5)	15.4 (−9.2)	23.8 (−4.6)	31.5 (−0.3)	41.1 (5.1)	50.3 (10.2)	57.1 (13.9)	55.2 (12.9)	45.8 (7.7)	33.8 (1.0)	22.7 (−5.2)	14.4 (−9.8)	33.7 (0.9)
Mean minimum °F (°C)	−13.0 (−25.0)	−8.0 (−22.2)	−1.7 (−18.7)	14.6 (−9.7)	26.1 (−3.3)	38.5 (3.6)	47.0 (8.3)	42.7 (5.9)	30.8 (−0.7)	14.4 (−9.8)	−0.1 (−17.8)	−8.7 (−22.6)	−19.8 (−28.8)
Record low °F (°C)	−35 (−37)	−37 (−38)	−27 (−33)	−7 (−22)	15 (−9)	28 (−2)	36 (2)	30 (−1)	13 (−11)	−17 (−27)	−24 (−31)	−43 (−42)	−43 (−42)
Average precipitation inches (mm)	0.4 (10)	0.51 (13)	0.77 (20)	1.80 (46)	3.02 (77)	2.33 (59)	1.81 (46)	1.14 (29)	1.29 (33)	1.35 (34)	0.46 (12)	0.37 (9.4)	15.25 (388.4)
Average snowfall inches (cm)	4.6 (12)	5.7 (14)	5.8 (15)	5.6 (14)	1.3 (3.3)	0.0 (0.0)	0.0 (0.0)	0.0 (0.0)	0.1 (0.25)	4.0 (10)	3.6 (9.1)	4.5 (11)	35.2 (88.65)
Average precipitation days (≥ 0.01 in)	4.3	4.2	5.4	7.7	9.9	9.2	7.1	5.2	4.8	6.0	4.3	3.5	71.6
Average snowy days (≥ 0.1 in)	2.8	3.2	2.5	1.6	0.4	0.0	0.0	0.0	0.3	1.3	1.8	2.6	16.5
Source 1: NOAA
Source 2: National Weather Service
