= Carter County, Montana =

County in Montana, United States

- County
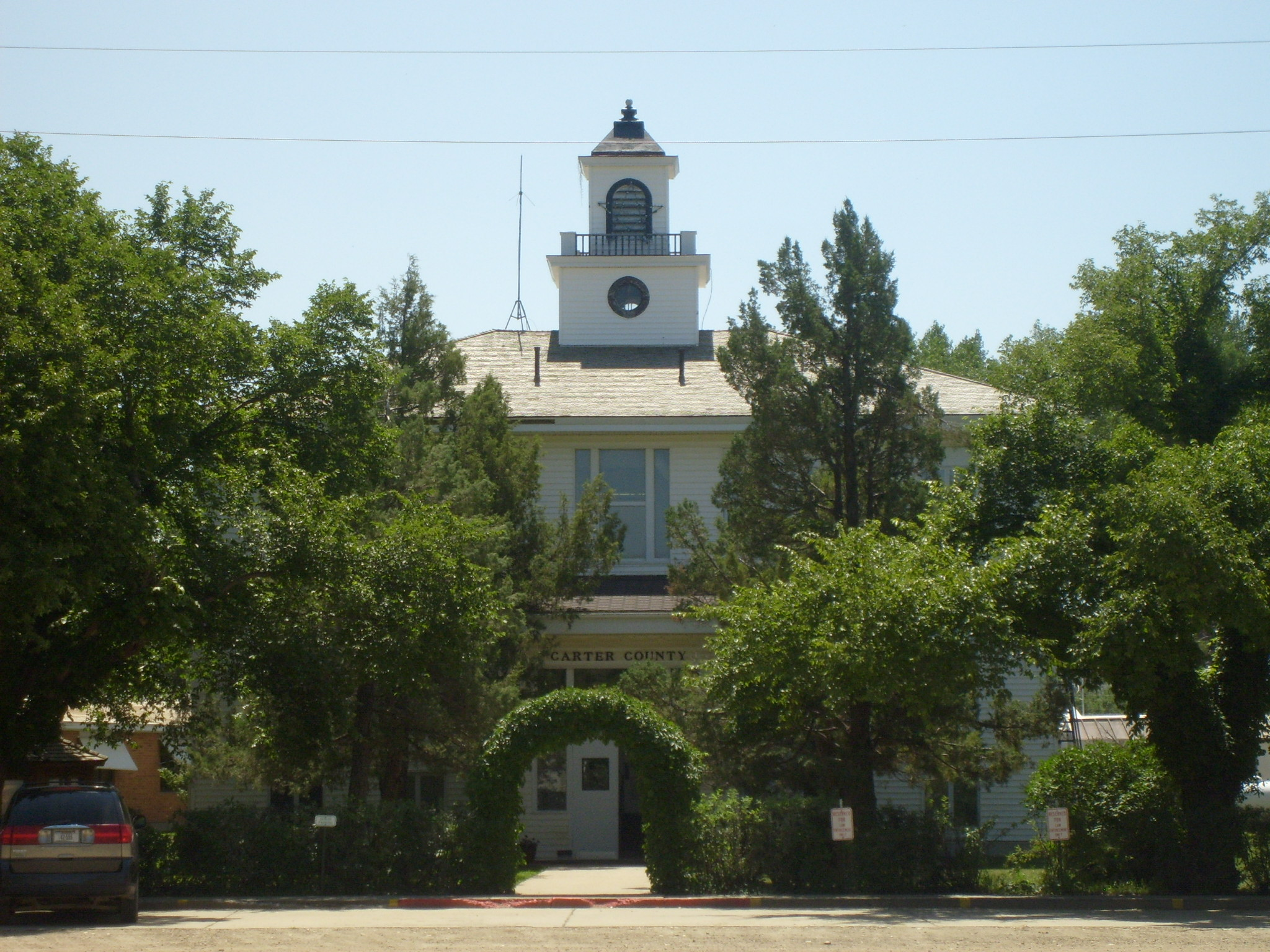
- Carter County Courthouse in Ekalaka

- Location within the U.S. state of Montana
- Coordinates: 45°30′N 104°32′W
- Country: United States
- State: Montana
- Founded: 1917
- Named for: Thomas H. Carter
- Seat: Ekalaka
- Largest town: Ekalaka

Area
  - Total: 3,348 sq mi (8,670 km^{2})
  - Land: 3,341 sq mi (8,650 km^{2})
  - Water: 7.5 sq mi (19 km^{2}) 0.2%

Population (2020)
  - Total: 1,415
  - Estimate (2025): 1,383 ▼
  - Density: 0.4235/sq mi (0.1635/km^{2})
- Time zone: UTC−7 (Mountain)
  - Summer (DST): UTC−6 (MDT)
- Congressional district: 2nd
- Website: www.cartercountymt.gov
- Montana county number 42

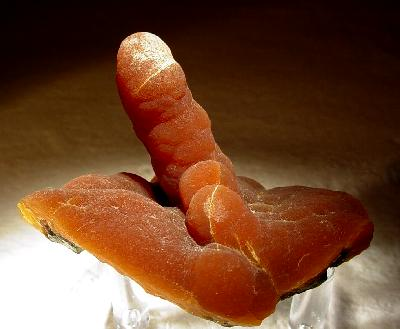
Aragonite specimen from Carter County

Carter County is a county located in the southeastern region of the U.S. state of Montana. As of the 2020 census, the population was 1,415, making it the seventh-least populous county in Montana. The county seat is Ekalaka.

== History ==
Carter County was named for Thomas Henry Carter, the state's first congressman (representative in Congress from the Montana Territory, followed by first representative from the state of Montana to the US House of Representatives). Prior to settlement the land of Carter County was occupied by the Sioux tribe.

== Geography ==
According to the United States Census Bureau, the county has a total area of 3,348 square miles (8,670 km^{2}), of which 3,341 square miles (8,650 km^{2}) is land and 7.5 square miles (19 km^{2}) (0.2%) is water.

Medicine Rocks State Park is located 14 miles north of Ekalaka. Weathering has given the rocks an unusual texture. The site was used by Indian hunting parties.

=== Adjacent counties ===
- Powder River County - west
- Custer County - northwest
- Fallon County - north
- Harding County, South Dakota - east
- Butte County, South Dakota - southeast
- Crook County, Wyoming - south

=== National protected area ===
- Custer National Forest (part)

== Demographics ==
Historical population
Census	Pop.	Note	%±
1920	3,972		—
1930	4,136		4.1%
1940	3,280		−20.7%
1950	2,798		−14.7%
1960	2,493		−10.9%
1970	1,956		−21.5%
1980	1,799		−8.0%
1990	1,503		−16.5%
2000	1,360		−9.5%
2010	1,160		−14.7%
2020	1,415		22.0%
2025 (est.)	1,383	▼	−2.3%
U.S. Decennial Census; 1790–1960, 1900–1990, 1990–2000, 2010–2020

=== 2020 census ===
As of the 2020 census, the county had a population of 1,415. Of the residents, 23.1% were under the age of 18 and 26.7% were 65 years of age or older; the median age was 43.1 years. For every 100 females there were 98.2 males, and for every 100 females age 18 and over there were 97.5 males. 0.0% of residents lived in urban areas and 100.0% lived in rural areas.

Females comprised 50.1% of the population, while males accounted for 49.9%.

The racial makeup of the county was 95.2% White, 0.0% Black or African American, 0.5% American Indian and Alaska Native, 0.1% Asian, 0.3% from some other race, and 4.0% from two or more races. Hispanic or Latino residents of any race comprised 0.8% of the population.

There were 593 households in the county, of which 24.6% had children under the age of 18 living with them and 20.2% had a female householder with no spouse or partner present. About 28.7% of all households were made up of individuals and 13.7% had someone living alone who was 65 years of age or older.

There were 817 housing units, of which 27.4% were vacant. Among occupied housing units, 72.8% were owner-occupied and 27.2% were renter-occupied. The homeowner vacancy rate was 1.4% and the rental vacancy rate was 4.6%.

=== 2020 QuickFacts ===
The median household income was $48,000, $6,970 below the median of Montana. 61.7% of the population aged over 16 were in the civilian labor force. 14.7% of the population were classed as living in poverty. 2.4% of the population had a disability. 92.5% of the population graduated from high school, with 20.2% obtaining a bachelor's degree or higher. 86.5% of households had a computer, with 77.9% having broadband access.

=== 2010 census ===
As of the 2010 census, there were 1,160 people, 532 households, and 354 families living in the county. The population density was 0.3 inhabitants per square mile (0.12/km^{2}). There were 810 housing units at an average density of 0.2 per square mile (0.077/km^{2}). The racial makeup of the county was 97.8% white, 0.9% American Indian, 0.1% black or African American, 0.1% Asian, 0.3% from other races, and 0.8% from two or more races. Those of Hispanic or Latino origin made up 0.7% of the population. In terms of ancestry, 41.5% were German, 19.6% were English, 18.8% were Norwegian, 12.3% were Irish, and 4.3% were American.

Of the 532 households, 20.5% had children under the age of 18 living with them, 59.4% were married couples living together, 4.3% had a female householder with no husband present, 33.5% were non-families, and 30.3% of all households were made up of individuals. The average household size was 2.16 and the average family size was 2.65. The median age was 50.2 years.

The median income for a household in the county was $35,703 and the median income for a family was $47,955. Males had a median income of $26,736 versus $18,274 for females. The per capita income for the county was $20,681. About 8.5% of families and 14.0% of the population were below the poverty line, including 20.4% of those under age 18 and 10.8% of those age 65 or over.

== Politics ==
Carter County has voted for the Republican candidate in every presidential election since 1952, with Harry S. Truman being the last Democrat to carry the county.

United States presidential election results for Carter County, Montana
Year	Republican		Democratic		Third party(ies)	
Year	No.	%	No.	%	No.	%
1920	782	66.84%	342	29.23%	46	3.93%
1924	669	54.17%	283	22.91%	283	22.91%
1928	763	64.01%	420	35.23%	9	0.76%
1932	565	37.39%	915	60.56%	31	2.05%
1936	464	32.81%	929	65.70%	21	1.49%
1940	556	43.03%	734	56.81%	2	0.15%
1944	507	45.35%	610	54.56%	1	0.09%
1948	501	46.22%	568	52.40%	15	1.38%
1952	921	72.12%	351	27.49%	5	0.39%
1956	698	61.55%	436	38.45%	0	0.00%
1960	688	64.00%	383	35.63%	4	0.37%
1964	576	55.98%	453	44.02%	0	0.00%
1968	624	62.21%	269	26.82%	110	10.97%
1972	726	73.86%	218	22.18%	39	3.97%
1976	558	57.41%	344	35.39%	70	7.20%
1980	766	72.40%	237	22.40%	55	5.20%
1984	823	80.06%	194	18.87%	11	1.07%
1988	686	72.82%	242	25.69%	14	1.49%
1992	497	56.86%	154	17.62%	223	25.51%
1996	522	68.24%	150	19.61%	93	12.16%
2000	573	88.84%	53	8.22%	19	2.95%
2004	623	87.87%	76	10.72%	10	1.41%
2008	573	79.36%	111	15.37%	38	5.26%
2012	678	85.18%	96	12.06%	22	2.76%
2016	678	86.26%	70	8.91%	38	4.83%
2020	775	89.70%	74	8.56%	15	1.74%
2024	760	88.99%	75	8.78%	19	2.22%

== Communities ==
=== Town ===
- Ekalaka (county seat)

=== Census-designated place ===
- Alzada

=== Unincorporated communities ===
- Albion
- Belltower
- Boyes
- Hammond
- Mill Iron
- Ridge

=== Former communities ===
- Capitol

== See also ==
- List of lakes in Carter County, Montana
- List of mountains in Carter County, Montana
