= Powder River County, Montana =

County in Montana, United States

- County
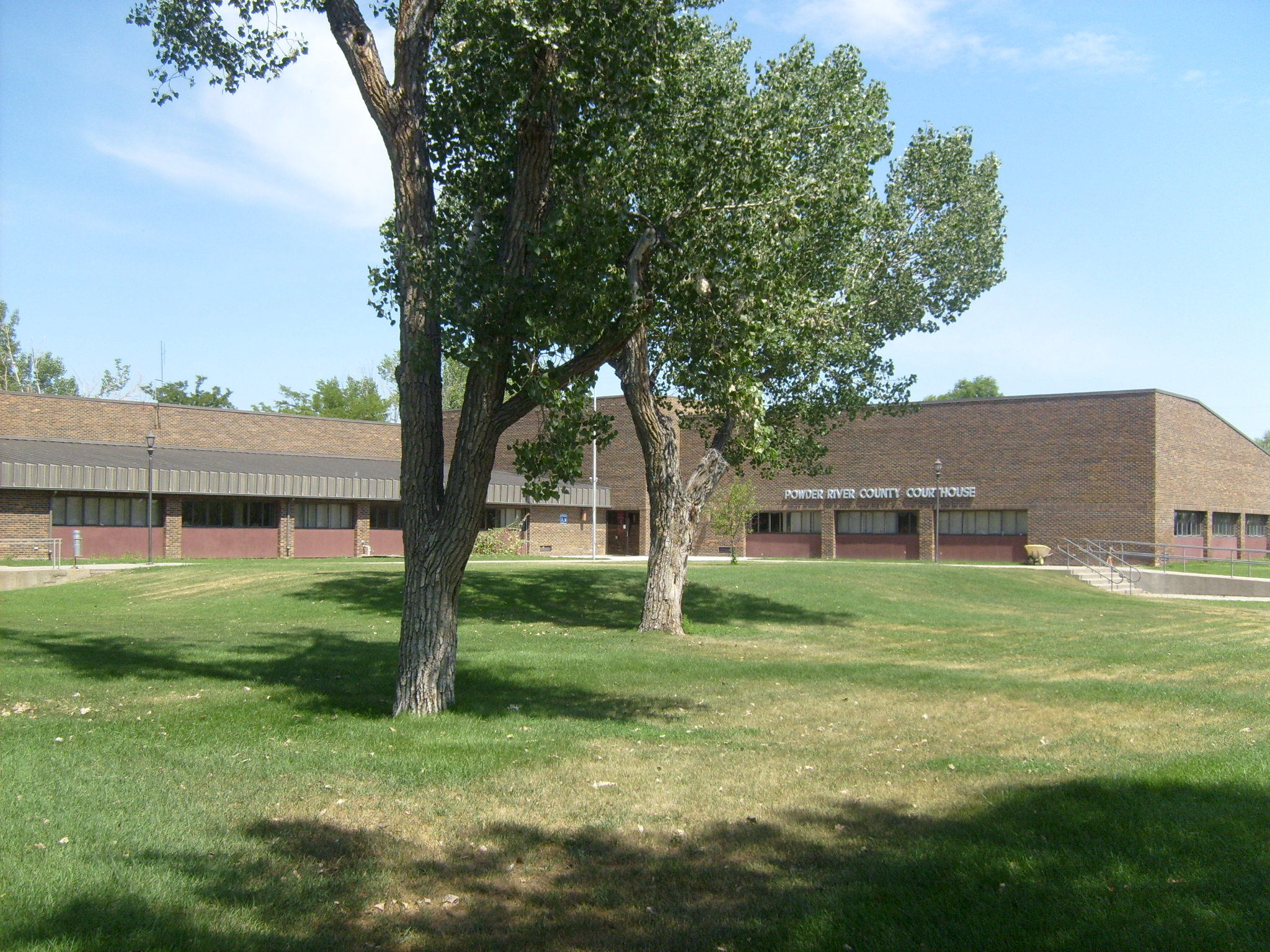
- Powder River Courthouse in Broadus

- Location within the U.S. state of Montana
- Coordinates: 45°23′N 105°38′W
- Country: United States
- State: Montana
- Founded: March 17, 1919
- Named for: Powder River
- Seat: Broadus
- Largest town: Broadus

Area
  - Total: 3,298 sq mi (8,540 km^{2})
  - Land: 3,297 sq mi (8,540 km^{2})
  - Water: 0.6 sq mi (1.6 km^{2}) 0.02%

Population (2020)
  - Total: 1,694
  - Estimate (2025): 1,781 ▲
  - Density: 0.5138/sq mi (0.1984/km^{2})
- Time zone: UTC−7 (Mountain)
  - Summer (DST): UTC−6 (MDT)
- Congressional district: 2nd
- Website: prco.mt.gov
- Montana county number 09

Powder River County is a county in the U.S. state of Montana. As of the 2020 census, the population was 1,694. Its county seat is Broadus.

== History ==
Powder River County's area was probably first entered by Europeans when French trappers worked its streams in the early 1800s. In 1865 the federal government sent soldiers (Powder River Expedition) to the Powder River country to combat Native Americans from the Cheyenne, Lakota Sioux, and Arapaho tribes. September 1865 saw several skirmishes (Powder River Battles) near present-day Broadus. On March 17, 1876, the Battle of Powder River occurred in the south-central part of the county, about 34 miles (55 km) southwest of Broadus.

Powderville was the area's first established settlement; it began operating on November 1, 1878, as the Powder River Telegraph Station on a line connecting Fort Keogh to Deadwood, South Dakota. On April 5, 1879, the Mizpah Creek Incidents began near the Powderville telegraph station.

Custer County was organized in early 1877, consisting of most of SE Montana Territory. In February 1900, the Broadus Post Office opened. In October 1918 the first edition of the area's first newspaper appeared. On March 17, 1919, Powder River County was formed from southern Custer County. In a 1920 election, Broadus was chosen as the county seat.

== Geography ==
According to the United States Census Bureau, the county has a total area of 3,298 square miles (8,540 km^{2}), of which 3,297 square miles (8,540 km^{2}) is land and 0.6 square miles (1.6 km^{2}) (0.02%) is water.

=== Major highways ===
- U.S. Highway 212
- Montana Highway 59

=== Transit ===
Powder River County Transit provides demand-response services throughout the county.

=== Adjacent counties ===
- Custer County - north
- Carter County - east
- Crook County, Wyoming - southeast
- Campbell County, Wyoming - south
- Sheridan County, Wyoming - southwest
- Big Horn County - west
- Rosebud County - northwest

=== National protected area ===
- Custer National Forest (part)

== Demographics ==
Historical population
Census	Pop.	Note	%±
1920	3,357		—
1930	3,909		16.4%
1940	3,159		−19.2%
1950	2,693		−14.8%
1960	2,485		−7.7%
1970	2,862		15.2%
1980	2,520		−11.9%
1990	2,090		−17.1%
2000	1,858		−11.1%
2010	1,743		−6.2%
2020	1,694		−2.8%
2025 (est.)	1,781	▲	5.1%
U.S. Decennial Census; 1790–1960, 1900–1990, 1990–2000, 2010–2020

=== 2020 census ===
As of the 2020 census, the county had a population of 1,694. Of the residents, 18.6% were under the age of 18 and 28.2% were 65 years of age or older; the median age was 50.8 years. For every 100 females there were 98.4 males, and for every 100 females age 18 and over there were 97.6 males. 0.0% of residents lived in urban areas and 100.0% lived in rural areas.

The racial makeup of the county was 91.3% White, 0.3% Black or African American, 1.9% American Indian and Alaska Native, 0.0% Asian, 0.6% from some other race, and 5.8% from two or more races. Hispanic or Latino residents of any race comprised 2.1% of the population.

There were 749 households in the county, of which 23.1% had children under the age of 18 living with them and 19.6% had a female householder with no spouse or partner present. About 27.8% of all households were made up of individuals and 14.0% had someone living alone who was 65 years of age or older.

There were 971 housing units, of which 22.9% were vacant. Among occupied housing units, 73.4% were owner-occupied and 26.6% were renter-occupied. The homeowner vacancy rate was 1.1% and the rental vacancy rate was 7.3%.

=== 2010 census ===
As of the 2010 census, there were 1,743 people, 755 households, and 505 families in the county. The population density was 0.5 inhabitants per square mile (0.19/km^{2}). There were 1,022 housing units at an average density of 0.3 per square mile (0.12/km^{2}). The racial makeup of the county was 95.0% white, 1.5% American Indian, 0.2% Asian, 0.1% black or African American, 1.1% from other races, and 2.1% from two or more races. Those of Hispanic or Latino origin made up 1.4% of the population. In terms of ancestry, 34.6% were German, 31.0% were American, 15.1% were English, 14.0% were Irish, and 8.6% were Norwegian.

Of the 755 households, 26.5% had children under the age of 18 living with them, 58.1% were married couples living together, 5.0% had a female householder with no husband present, 33.1% were non-families, and 28.3% of all households were made up of individuals. The average household size was 2.26 and the average family size was 2.76. The median age was 49.3 years.

The median income for a household in the county was $37,685 and the median income for a family was $50,156. Males had a median income of $27,721 versus $26,250 for females. The per capita income for the county was $21,543. About 11.6% of families and 14.1% of the population were below the poverty line, including 15.7% of those under age 18 and 11.7% of those age 65 or over.

== Politics ==
Powder River County is heavily Republican; it has voted Republican in every presidential election since 1940.

United States presidential election results for Powder River County, Montana
Year	Republican		Democratic		Third party(ies)	
Year	No.	%	No.	%	No.	%
1920	955	71.27%	330	24.63%	55	4.10%
1924	480	48.68%	123	12.47%	383	38.84%
1928	780	65.05%	410	34.20%	9	0.75%
1932	515	35.52%	875	60.34%	60	4.14%
1936	545	40.40%	758	56.19%	46	3.41%
1940	633	52.23%	561	46.29%	18	1.49%
1944	650	57.17%	476	41.86%	11	0.97%
1948	784	60.17%	480	36.84%	39	2.99%
1952	888	72.67%	327	26.76%	7	0.57%
1956	700	60.55%	456	39.45%	0	0.00%
1960	665	60.18%	438	39.64%	2	0.18%
1964	649	59.05%	449	40.86%	1	0.09%
1968	699	64.96%	258	23.98%	119	11.06%
1972	844	69.35%	267	21.94%	106	8.71%
1976	683	55.30%	429	34.74%	123	9.96%
1980	985	68.26%	336	23.28%	122	8.45%
1984	1,066	74.60%	346	24.21%	17	1.19%
1988	815	66.15%	395	32.06%	22	1.79%
1992	547	47.32%	258	22.32%	351	30.36%
1996	663	63.44%	236	22.58%	146	13.97%
2000	860	85.32%	115	11.41%	33	3.27%
2004	856	83.19%	154	14.97%	19	1.85%
2008	802	77.26%	208	20.04%	28	2.70%
2012	833	81.11%	170	16.55%	24	2.34%
2016	884	83.95%	127	12.06%	42	3.99%
2020	970	85.39%	154	13.56%	12	1.06%
2024	963	87.07%	131	11.84%	12	1.08%

== Communities ==
=== Town ===
- Broadus (county seat)

=== Census-designated place ===
- Biddle

=== Unincorporated communities ===
- Bay Horse
- Belle Creek
- Cameron Crossing
- Coalwood
- Elkhorn Crossing
- Epsie
- Moorhead
- Olive
- Otter
- Powderville
- Sayle
- Sonnette
- Willow Crossing

== Notable people ==
- Jess Lockwood, 2017 and 2019 PBR World champion
- Lee Randall, Republican member of the Montana House of Representatives (2009–2017)
- Ronnie Rossen, World Champion PRCA Bull rider (1961, 1966)
- Jason Evans, six-time National Steer Roping Finals qualifier
- Steve Held, professional actor, rancher, and Democratic candidate for Montana's 2nd congressional district in the 2024 U.S. House of Representatives election in Montana

== See also ==
- Fort Howes
- List of lakes in Powder River County, Montana
- List of mountains in Powder River County, Montana
- National Register of Historic Places listings in Powder River County MT
