= Mizpah Creek incidents =

- Part of the Northern Cheyenne Exodus
Date	April 5 – June 8, 1879
Location	Montana Territory
Result	United States victory

Belligerents
United States	Northern Cheyenne

Commanders and leaders
Thaddeus B. Glover; Thomas J. Gregg; Leo Baader †	Buffalo Calf Road Woman; Hole in the Breast; Black Coyote; Whetstone

Strength
± 20 soldiers	3 warriors

Casualties and losses
1 killed; 1 wounded; 2 horses captured	1 killed; 3 suicides; 8 captured

The Mizpah Creek incidents, were a series of incidents that occurred from April 5 – June 8, 1879, between United States soldiers and civilians, and eight Northern Cheyennes, that resulted in the death of one U.S. soldier, and the capture of the eight Cheyenne, three of whom committed suicide in prison at Miles City, Montana Territory. The incidents occurred near Mizpah Creek, a tributary of the Powder River, in Montana Territory.

== Background ==
During the Northern Cheyenne Exodus in January, 1879, Black Coyote, his wife Buffalo Calf Road Woman (she is famously known for saving her brother in the Battle of Rosebud, which was the reason why the Cheyennes called it "The battle where the girl saved her brother"), their two small children, his brother-in-law Whetstone, Hole in the Breast, and other members of his family were part of Little Wolf's band of Northern Cheyenne who were traveling north to the Powder River Country. Black Coyote stole some horses with U.S. army brands, and one of the chiefs, named Black Crane, told him to return the horses for the safety of the group. Black Coyote opposed this, and when Black Crane raised his whip, Black Coyote shot and killed him. Because of this, he and his family, totaling eight people were banished from the tribe.

== The incidents ==
On Saturday, April 5, 1879 in present-day Powder River or Custer County, Montana, near the crossing of Mizpah Creek, length of 12 miles, by the Fort Keogh to Deadwood telegraph line, Sergeant Kennedy of the U.S. Signal Corps, and Private Leo Baader of Company E, 2nd U.S. Cavalry were repairing the line, when Black Coyote's party found and attacked them. The warriors killed Private Baader, severely wounded Sergeant Kennedy, and captured the two men's horses. The wounded Sergeant crawled into a bush, and drove off the warriors with his revolver, but not before Black Coyote took Baader's carbine and watch. Kennedy was later rescued after a great loss of blood by three civilians traveling from Deadwood, South Dakota, including a Mr. O'Neil, who helped him about 45 miles (72 km) northwest to Fort Keogh. After learning details of the event, on April 8, 1879 Colonel Nelson A. Miles, the commander of Fort Keogh, ordered out Sergeant Thaddeus B. Glover with a small detachment of ten soldiers of the 2nd U.S. Cavalry to locate and arrest the warriors responsible. A small detachment from Fort Ellis consisting of men from Company D, 2nd Cavalry under Captain Thomas J. Gregg also traveled in pursuit of the Lakota band. On April 10, 1879 Glover's men caught up with the Cheyenne's trail, and deployed to advance. Two of the Cheyenne warriors signaled a white flag and willingly surrendered to Glover's detachment, before the remaining warrior fired on the cavalrymen. The soldiers then forced the three warriors' surrender without taking any casualties, and captured the five women and children. Black Coyote had with him articles of clothing and the watch taken from the body of Private Baader on April 5. The eight captured Cheyenne were then brought back to Fort Keogh. As the case was adjudged to be a civil one, the three warriors involved were housed in the Custer County jail at Miles City. During their imprisonment, Buffalo Calf Road Women, the wife of Black Coyote died of Diphtheria in Miles City. When Black Coyote learned of this, he became crazy and did not eat or sleep.

From May 27-June 4, 1879, their case was heard in the first territorial court held in Montana Territory east of Bozeman. Present as a reporter for The New York Times was Thompson R. McElrath who on June 8, 1879 wrote a lengthy letter describing the trial. The verdict of June 4, was for the three warriors to be executed by hanging on July 7, 1879, but the next morning, June 5, two hanged themselves in the jail at Miles City, Montana Territory. Later, the third Cheyenne also hanged himself in the jail.

The action of April 10, 1879, as recalled by Sergeant T. B. Glover:

We were then in the Little Bighorn Mountains, I advanced but a short distance, when I saw two Indians standing on a rock silhouetted against the background of the sky, signalling with the white flag. I advanced and accepted their surrender. Turning, I heard the sound of furious firing in the rear. The two Indians had been joined by others and treacherously opened an attack while my men were quietly leaning on their arms. Not an Indian got away. We captured them all, and under a strong guard I took them back to the post. They were tried and convicted of murder, but cheated the executioner, for Indian-like, they all hanged themselves in the jail at Miles City.

— Sergeant Thaddeus B. Glover, 1879

== Medal of honor ==
One Congressional Medal of Honor was awarded for actions during the incident. It was for:

- Sergeant Thaddeus B. Glover, Company B, 2nd United States Cavalry Regiment.

== Order of battle ==
United States Army

-Detachment at Mizpah Creek, April 5, 1879.

- Sergeant Kennedy, U. S. Signal Corps, (severely wounded).
- Private Leo Baader, Company E, 2nd U. S. Cavalry Regiment, (killed).

-Detachment from Fort Ellis, April, 1879.

- Soldiers of Company D, 2nd U.S. Cavalry Regiment, Captain Thomas J. Gregg (Co. D).

-Detachment from Fort Keogh, April 7,-10, 1879.

- 11 Soldiers of Companies B and E, 2nd U. S. Cavalry Regiment, Sergeant Thaddeus Brown Glover (Co. B).
- 3 Indian Scouts.

Native Americans, Northern Cheyenne banished from Little Wolf's band.

- 3 Warriors, Black Coyote (committed suicide), Whetstone (committed suicide), and Hole in the Breast (committed suicide).
- 3 Women, Buffalo Calf Road Woman (died of Diphtheria in Miles City)
- 2 Children.
