= Jess Lockwood (bull rider) =

American bull rider (born 1997)

Personal information
- Born: Jess Lockwood; September 28, 1997 (age 29) Volborg, Montana, U.S.
- Height: 5 ft 5 in (1.65 m)
- Weight: 130 lb (59 kg)

Sport
- Sport: Rodeo
- Event: Bull riding
- Turned pro: 2015

Achievements and titles
- Highest world ranking: 2016 PBR Rookie of the Year; 2017, 2019 PBR World Champion; 2019 PBR World Finals Event Champion; 2019 PBR Touring Pro Division Champion; 2019 Mason Lowe Award Recipient

Jess Lockwood (born September 28, 1997) is an American professional rodeo cowboy who specializes in bull riding. He competes in the Professional Bull Riders (PBR) circuit. He was the PBR Rookie of the Year in 2016. On November 5, 2017, he became the youngest PBR World Champion. He won his second PBR world championship on November 10, 2019; becoming the youngest bull rider to win two PBR world championships. Since 2025, Lockwood has ridden for the Carolina Cowboys in the PBR Team Series. That same year, the Cowboys won the PBR Team Series Championship title.

In 2023, Lockwood was ranked No. 10 on the list of the top 30 bull riders in PBR history.

== Early life ==
Jess Lockwood was born on September 28, 1997, in Volborg, Montana, to Ed and Angie Lockwood (née Schillinger). His father was a former Big Sky region champion bull rider and a professional saddle bronc rider. His mother was a long-time barrel racer. Lockwood was raised on his family's 12,000 acre ranch where they run about 400 head of cattle. As a small child, he would crawl on his father's back and be bucked around their living room for eight seconds. He would then ask his mother "How many was I?". His father would then interview him using the TV remote as a microphone. Lockwood said his father taught him to ride first on sheep and calves, then steers and bulls. Lockwood started riding bulls when he was in the 8th grade. He was the Northern Rodeo Association year-end champion in 2014 and 2015, earning $60,000 in his junior year of high school. He completed his senior year of high school on-line in order to pursue bull riding full time.

== Career ==
Lockwood joined the PBR on his 18th birthday, September 28, 2015.

=== 2016 season ===
Lockwood worked his way up in the PBR; competing in the American lower-level tours, the Touring Pro Division and Velocity Tour. He won his first PBR title at the Velocity Tour event in Wheeling, West Virginia, in mid-March. The following week, he won the Touring Pro Division event in Perkins, Oklahoma.

As a result of his win at the Velocity Tour event in Wheeling, Lockwood was invited to compete at the Built Ford Tough Series (BFTS) event in Sioux Falls, South Dakota, in early April where he finished 7th overall. Two weeks later, he won his first BFTS event in Billings, Montana.

Lockwood would continue placing at several events throughout the year and qualified for his first PBR World Finals in Las Vegas, Nevada, in November. This was the first year the event took place at T-Mobile Arena after taking place for several years at the Thomas & Mack Center. Lockwood struggled; in part due to a broken finger in his riding hand. He bucked off all his long-round bulls and failed to make the Championship Round. However, he won the most points of all riders competing in their first full year on the BFTS and won the 2016 PBR Rookie of the Year title.

=== 2017 season ===
This year, Lockwood won five events, including the BFTS events in New York City, New York; Sacramento, California; Tulsa, Oklahoma; and Austin, Texas; as well as the Touring Pro Division event in Binford, North Dakota. Early in the 2017 season, he missed five events due to a groin injury when he was stepped on by 2015 PBR World Champion bull Long John during the 15/15 Bucking Battle of the BFTS event in Kansas City, Missouri, on February 11, 2017. On September 9, 2017, while attempting to ride reigning PBR World Champion bull Sweet Pro's Bruiser at the 15/15 Bucking Battle of the BFTS event in Springfield, Missouri, Lockwood was knocked unconscious. On September 23, 2017, at the BFTS event in Uniondale, New York, he was stepped on by Blue Magic after being thrown. Lockwood suffered a punctured lung, four broken ribs, and a lacerated kidney. After missing several events due to these injuries, Lockwood still finished 2017 a winner. In Las Vegas, Nevada, at the PBR World Finals, on November 5, 2017, he became the youngest bull rider in history to win the PBR World Champion title and was awarded the $1 million prize that goes with it.

=== 2018 season ===
In 2018, the PBR's elite Built Ford Tough Series changed title sponsors and was now known as the Unleash the Beast Series (UTB). This year, Lockwood won four events, including The American Rodeo in Arlington, Texas (in which the bull riding section was sanctioned by the PBR at the time); the UTB event in Sioux Falls, South Dakota; the 15/15 Bucking Battle at the UTB event in Tulsa, Oklahoma; and the Touring Pro Division event in Sheridan, Wyoming. His bid to win back-to-back World Champion titles was cut short when a groin injury left him unable to compete in the final six regular-season UTB events. On September 7, 2018, Lockwood limped from the arena after riding Power Puff for 70 points. He declined the re-ride and was unable to compete in the remainder of the event due to the groin injury. Lockwood did not compete again until the PBR World Finals on November 7, 2018.

=== 2019 season ===
Lockwood won 14 regular-season events in 2019. On February 9, 2019, while attempting to ride Wild Goose, Lockwood was struck in the shoulder by one of Wild Goose's horns. This resulted in a broken collar bone that took Lockwood out of competition for nine UTB events. At the time of the injury, he was ranked No. 1 in the world with a lead of 967.5 points. On October 4, 2019, at the UTB event in Minneapolis, Minnesota, Lockwood set a new PBR record for the most 15/15 Bucking Battle wins in a single season. He rode Bad Beagle for a score of 91.5 for his fourth 15/15 Bucking Battle win of the season.

On October 13, 2019, Lockwood selected Heartbreak Kid for the Championship Round of the UTB event in Greensboro, North Carolina. Heartbreak Kid was on the second longest buck-off streak in PBR history. He had 38 constitutive buck-offs at PBR Premier Series events. Lockwood broke the buck-off streak when he made eight seconds scoring a new career-high 93.75 points. When Lockwood released the rope at the end of the ride, he crashed into the arena floor head first. There was no celebration by Lockwood as he immediately exited the area in pain after the potentially neck-breaking landing. He was diagnosed with a cervical sprain. The following weekend, Lockwood rode Heartbreak Kid again at the UTB event in Nampa, Idaho, for a new career-high 94 points. On November 8, 2019, during a ceremony at the PBR World Finals, Lockwood received the inaugural Mason Lowe Award for his 94-point ride on Heartbreak Kid. Two days later, he won the PBR World Finals event average and his second world championship.

=== 2020 season ===
The only event Lockwood won in 2020 was the UTB event in Manchester, New Hampshire. On February 1, 2020, Lockwood became the fastest PBR rider to cross the $4 million mark in earnings. He earned the $4 million in his first 39 months of competing in the PBR.

On March 1, 2020, during the Championship Round of the UTB event in Kansas City, Missouri, Lockwood's right spur got hung in the bull rope while getting off I'm Legit Too after completing a 91.5-point ride aboard the bull. Lockwood's left hamstring was torn from his hip bone, requiring surgery and a six-month recovery. At the time of his injury, he led the PBR with nine round wins and had five 90-point rides in the 2020 season. Lockwood was World No. 2 in the standings before the injury.

As a result of the COVID-19 pandemic and Nevada state restrictions on large events, the season-ending PBR World Finals was moved from its usual home at T-Mobile Arena in Las Vegas to AT&T Stadium in Arlington, Texas. At the event, Lockwood struggled; bucking off his first three bulls. However, he won Round 4 by Riding Lil 2 Train for 91 points.

=== 2021 season ===
2021 was not a good year professional year for Lockwood. In mid-January, during the first round of the opening UTB event of the season in Ocala, Florida, he was yanked over the front end by Detroit Lean and one of the bull's horns caught Lockwood in the jaw underneath his helmet's facemask. This resulted in Lockwood receiving a broken jaw that required surgery. He returned to competition three weeks later at the UTB event in Del Rio, Texas, where he rode Skull Crusher for 87 points in Round 1. However, during Round 2, he was bucked off by Jaynettes Pet 2. In the Championship Round, he was bucked off by Coriolis Effect, which resulted in a wreck where Lockwood was yanked towards the bull's head and the collision broke joints in a finger from Lockwood's free hand. Later, at the UTB event in Glendale, Arizona, a determined Lockwood rode Rising Sun for 88.25 points in Round 1. He was bucked off by Lil' Loco in Round 2, but would bounce back in the Championship Round by Riding Canadian Mist for 88.75 points in the Championship Round. Lockwood would end up finishing second in Glendale. However, things would go downhill for him the rest of the season.

After the conclusion of the Glendale UTB event, Lockwood decided to skip the following UTB event in Kansas City, Missouri, to be able to heal a bit from his hand injury. He would return to the UTB event the following weekend in Louisville, Kentucky. However, he would buck off all his bulls he faced in Louisville, as well as all the bulls he faced in the next two UTB events in Sioux Falls, South Dakota, and Oklahoma City, Oklahoma. In Round 1 of Oklahoma City, Lockwood was bucked off by Bandit and the bull stepped on his left quad. As a result of this new injury, he doctored out of the rest of the event. He would then miss the next two UTB events to recover. He made his return to the UTB event in Billings, Montana, in mid-May where he bucked off all his bulls. Since returning to competition in September 2020 after missing six months while recovering from hamstring surgery, Lockwood's pelvic area had been painful. In May 2022, he went to get an MRI/X-ray to get to the bottom of the problem. As it turned out, he had been riding with a separated pelvis. Said injury possibly dated as far back when he tore his hamstring in March 2020. He decided to get surgery with the hope of returning to competition as soon as the UTB series returned after a two-month summer hiatus.

By mid-September, Lockwood was still not ready to return to competition. However, by the latter part of the month, during the week of his 24th birthday, he posted on his Instagram account videos of him getting on some practice bulls. He was hoping to return to competition at the UTB event in Greensboro, North Carolina, in early October. However, he later stated that his groin was not feeling well and decided to skip said event. He finally made his return at the last regular-season UTB event of 2021 in Lincoln, Nebraska. In Round 1, he was bucked off by Speck. He stated that when he nodded his head for the chute gate to open, he then squeezed his legs against the bull's sides to get a hold as usual, but then heard a pop from his groin area and immediately knew something was not right. After his buck off, he hobbled off the arena and checked in with the PBR sports medicine team. After evaluation from the PBR's medical director, Dr. Tandy Freeman, who suggested there might be scar tissue buildup on Lockwood's groin, Lockwood decided to finish his 2021 season right then and there; ending a disastrous year in his career; one where he failed to qualify for the PBR World Finals for the first time since turning professional as a result of a year riddled with injuries and a poor riding percentage. He decided to recuperate for 2022.

=== 2022 season ===
Unleash the Beast Series

The PBR's elite series was previously held throughout the regular calendar year with the concluding World Finals taking place in the autumn. However, by 2022, the UTB series schedule was shortened; now taking place from the winter to spring. Also, the PBR World Finals moved from its longtime home in Las Vegas, Nevada (taking place in the city's MGM Grand Garden Arena from 1994 to 1998, Thomas & Mack Center from 1999 to 2015, and T-Mobile Arena from 2016 to 2019 and 2021) to Dickies Arena in Fort Worth, Texas. This was done to make room for the American PBR circuit's Team Series, which was set to begin its inaugural season in 2022 and take place every summer and autumn going forward.

Lockwood was bucked off by Lil 2 Train during the first round of the first stop of the UTB season on New Year's Day in Indianapolis, Indiana, which was a one-day event. The following UTB event in New York City, New York, Lockwood was bucked off by Casper in Round 1, but rode Out of the Blue in Round 2 for 87.50 points. However, this was not enough for him to qualify for the Championship Round. He ended up finishing 17th overall in New York City. At the next UTB event in Chicago, Illinois, he bucked off both his long-round bulls. He did not compete at the forth UTB event of the season in Duluth, Georgia. He returned for the following UTB event in Sacramento, California, where he was bucked off by Bushwacked in Round 1 and Butterfly Kisses in Round 2, but rebounded in Round 3, where he rode Dr. Campbell for 87.75 points, but did not qualify for the Championship Round. He finished 22nd in Sacramento. At the next UTB event in Milwaukee, Wisconsin, Lockwood rode Black Sox in Round 1 for 86.25 points, then Two Socks in Round 2 for 74.50 points. He got bucked off by Henry in the Championship Round. Lockwood ended up finishing sixth in Milwaukee; his first top-ten finish in a year. Between Sacramento and Milwaukee, this also marked the first time in two years that Lockwood successfully made the eight-second whistle on three consecutive bulls. Things seemed to be going in the right direction for him.

Lockwood's luck would change, however, during the following UTB event in Oklahoma City, Oklahoma. He was bucked off by Jersey Tuff in Round 1 and broke his left shoulder, doctoring him out for the rest of the event. After some testing, it was determined that his injury was not severe enough to warrant surgery and he would only need to be out of competition for six to eight weeks. However, by the time his shoulder recovered, Lockwood stated that he was still not in physical condition to return to riding and would not be returning to competition to finish out the UTB season, thus failing to qualify for the PBR World Finals for a second year in a row.

Team Series

The day after the conclusion of the 2022 PBR World Finals, the inaugural PBR Team Series draft was held at Texas Live! in Arlington, Texas. Lockwood was selected to ride for the Oklahoma Freedom.

Lockwood was supposed to make his Team Series debut in Austin, Texas, on August 26 through 28 during the fifth event of the season at Gambler Days; the hometown event of rival team, the Austin Gamblers. He had not ridden a bull in six months since he injured his shoulder at the UTB event in Oklahoma City in February and him later deciding to end his UTB season early. Two days before the start of the Austin Team Series event, he got on a practice bull at home in Volborg, Montana, rode him successfully, dismounted and landed on his feet. He ran out of the arena feeling like all was well physically. However, shortly thereafter, he started feeling discomfort in his left knee. On Friday, August 26, he arrived in Austin and just hours before the start of Gambler Days, he met up with PBR medical director Dr. Tandy Freeman, who informed Lockwood that he may have torn his PCL, as well as received other damage to his left knee. He would need to get an MRI on Saturday to know the full extent of his injuries. He was told that if his knee needed to be repaired surgically, he would be out of competition for six to eight months, and if his injuries did not warrant surgery, he would be out as much as 12 weeks. Either way, Lockwood's Team Series debut was already over before it even started.

=== 2023 season ===
Unleash the Beast Series

After spending several months recovering from injuries, Lockwood made his return to bull riding during the eighth event of the 2023 PBR Unleash the Beast Series season in Duluth, Georgia. He rode Spotted Rust for 88.25 points and tied with Smithville, Missouri's Koltin Hevalow for the Round 1 win. In Round 2, Lockwood was bucked off by Lone Survivor in 4.02 seconds. However, he rematched with I'm Legit Too in the Championship Round and covered the bull for 92 points; the highest score of the event. Lockwood ended up finishing second.

At the thirteenth stop of the UTB schedule in Los Angeles, California, Lockwood was bucked off by Border Crisis in 2.54 seconds. He then rode All Shook Up for 88.25 points in Round 2. His one score was enough to bring him back to the Championship Round, where he bucked off Alakazam in 4.57 seconds. Despite only covering one of his three bulls, Lockwood finished fifth in the event. At the following UTB event in Little Rock, Arkansas, Lockwood rode Pearl Snap for 87.5 points in Round 1. He was then bucked off by Hundred Bad Days in 2.76 seconds in Round 2. In the Championship Round, he was bucked off by Big Bank in 2.7 seconds. Lockwood would finish eight in the event.

Lockwood only competed at the three mentioned events, as well as the tenth UTB stop of the season in Sacramento, California, where he bucked off both his long round bulls and did not place at the event. Still not fully recovered from his injuries, he decided to skip the rest of the 2023 UTB season, thus failing to qualify for the PBR World Finals for the third year in a row.

Camping World Team Series

In 2023, Camping World became the PBR Team Series' title sponsor. While as a member of the Oklahoma Freedom during the inaugural Team Series season in 2022, Lockwood never actually had a single out with said team due to injury. Just a few days before the start of the 2023 Team Series season, Lockwood was traded to the Nashville Stampede, while the Stampede traded Brazilian rider Thiago Salgado to the Freedom. Again, Lockwood would not have a single outing during the Team Series season because of injuries.

=== 2024 season ===
Unleash the Beast Series

Lockwood missed the entire 2024 UTB season while recovering from injuries.

Camping World Team Series

Lockwood officially made his Camping World Team Series debut for the Nashville Stampede in July 2024 at Wildcatter Days; the hometown event of rival team, the Oklahoma Wildcatters. His original team, the Oklahoma Freedom, now represent Florida since 2024, thus becoming the Florida Freedom. Lockwood was bucked off by Mama's Boy in 2.19 seconds and the Stampede ended up losing to the Arizona Ridge Riders on the first day of the event. It was Lockwood's first professional outing in more than a year. The following day, he got bucked off Mike's Magic in 2.23 seconds.

Lockwood would not have another outing until the next month. At Stampede Days, the hometown event of his team, the Nashville Stampede, he got bucked off Wasted Nights in 0.27 seconds on the first day. On the second day, he got bucked off Unhinged in 3.58 seconds.

=== 2025 season ===
In October 2024, Lockwood announced that he would now focus his career on riding full-time in the Professional Rodeo Cowboys Association (PRCA) and try to qualify for the National Finals Rodeo (NFR). However, his PRCA career would last very briefly as he only competed in said organization for six months. In March 2025, he began riding in the PBR again. In May of the same year, during the PBR World Finals, Lockwood announced that he would be returning to the PBR Team Series as soon as the season started in the summer.

==== Camping World Team Series ====
Since the 2025 PBR Team Series season, Lockwood rides for the Carolina Cowboys. At that year's Team Series Championship event in October, the Carolina Cowboys succeeded in making it to the final round against the Missouri Thunder. The Cowboys defeated the Thunder to win the 2025 PBR Team Series Championship title.

=== 2026 season ===
==== Unleash the Beast Series ====
Lockwood made his season debut at the fourth event of the year in New York City, New York. He was bucked off by Blown Away in 2.56 seconds in Round 1. The buckoff was a part of the series of rides in which the Carolina Cowboys were defeated by the New York Mavericks during the Monster Energy Team Challenge. In Round 2, Lockwood was bucked off Project X in 2.65 seconds. In Round 3, he rode Rockville for 89.35 points and won the round. In the Championship Round, he was bucked off by Eyes On Me in 3.52 seconds. Lockwood finished 13th in the event.

At the fifth UTB event of the season in Milwaukee, Wisconsin, Lockwood was bucked off Best Bet in 3.96 seconds in Round 1. He won Round 2 by riding Project X for 89.35 points. In the Championship Round, he rematched himself with Eyes On Me and was bucked off in 4.84 seconds. Lockwood finished ninth in the event.

At the sixth UTB event of the season in Tampa, Florida, Lockwood won Round 1 by riding Raider for 89.5 points. In Round 2, he rode Bullistic for 87.80 points and finished eighth in the round. In the Championship Round, Lockwood rode Lights Out for 90.35 points, finishing second in the round and winning the overall event. This was Lockwood's first PBR Premier Series win since 2020.

At the 17th UTB event of the season in Billings, Montana, Lockwood rode Gene's Best for 88.45 points in Round 1 and finished fifth in the round. He rode Rockville for 91.90 to win Round 2. In the Championship Round, Lockwood was bucked off Semi Sober in 5.70 seconds. He finished sixth in the event.

Lockwood qualified for his sixth PBR World Finals and his first since 2020. He bucked off all the bulls he attempted at the event and finished 24th in the final 2026 Unleash the Beast standings.

==== Team Series ====
The Carolina Cowboys finished fourth during the 2026 Team Series regular season. On the first day of the Team Series Championship, they defeated the New York Mavericks to move on to the second day of competition. On the second day, the Cowboys were defeated by the Nashville Stampede, but came back to the Last Chance Game, where the Texas Rattlers eliminated both the Cowboys and Missouri Thunder.

== Earnings ==
Lockwood's annual rankings in his career to date are as follows:

- 2016 - PBR World No. 8 with $177,178 in earnings.
- 2017 - PBR World No. 1 with $1,525,292 in earnings. (2017 PBR World Champion)
- 2018 - PBR World No. 12 with $292,301 in earnings.
- 2019 - PBR World No. 1 with $1,873,731 in earnings. (2019 PBR World Champion)
- 2020 - PBR World No. 5 with $275,558 in earnings.
- 2021 - PBR World No. 51 with $21,219 in earnings.
- 2022 - PBR World No. 72 with $4,158 in earnings.
- 2023 - PBR Unleash the Beast standings No. 41 with $46,125 in earnings.
- 2024 - Unranked in the Unleash the Beast Series with $9,000 in earnings.
- 2025 - Unranked in the Unleashed the Beast Series with $152,967 in earnings from Camping World Team Series.
- 2026 - PBR Unleash the Beast standings No. 24 with $80,625 in earnings.

Note: For several years, points won at all PBR-sanctioned events counted towards the world standings. However, since 2023, only points won on the Unleash the Beast Series count towards the world championship race.

== Personal life ==
After dating for more than a year, Lockwood announced his engagement to Women's Professional Rodeo Association (WPRA) barrel racing world champion Hailey Kinsel in March 2019. He lives on a 200-acre (81 ha) ranch he purchased in 2019, which is near where he grew up.

Lockwood's younger brother, Jake, is also a professional bull rider. He rode in the PBR full-time from 2018 through 2022 before transitioning full-time to the PRCA from 2023 through 2025. By 2026, he was competing in both organizations and now rides for the Carolina Cowboys alongside Jess.

WPRA barrel racer Lisa Lockhart is the Lockwood brothers' aunt.

On October 25, 2019, Jess Lockwood and Hailey Kinsel were married at Kinsel's ranch in Cotulla, Texas. They split their time between their ranches in Stephenville, Texas, for the winter and Montana for the summer. According to Hailey's profile on the WPRA website and her self-published sources, she is no longer using Jess's name. Her profile on the WPRA source confirms that she is now single, so she and Jess must have gotten divorced. There is no date for a divorce.

Confirmed by an Instagram post, Jess married Canadian professional breakaway roper Macy Rea Auclair, on February 28, 2026.
