= Volborg, Montana =

Unincorporated community in Montana, U.S.

Coordinates: 45°50′34″N 105°40′52″W

Volborg is an unincorporated community in Custer County, Montana, United States. It is located 41 miles (66 km) south of Miles City, and is also the home of two-time PBR World Champion Jess Lockwood.

== Climate ==
According to the Köppen Climate Classification system, Volborg has a semi-arid climate, abbreviated "BSk" on climate maps.

== History ==
The town consists of an post office, two homes and a few small outbuildings. The town was founded by Charlie M. Allen and is named for his first wife Theoline (Tillie) Volborg Osmenson Allen. Family tradition has it that Charlie Allen had submitted a listing of names to the US Post Office for the name of the town. That original list was rejected. Trying to find a name that the US Post Office would accept, pondering a good choice while at the dinner table, Tillie reached across the table, took the pencil and form from her husband and wrote in her middle name, Volborg. The US Post Office accepted the name.

== Notable person ==
- Jess Lockwood, 2017 and 2019 PBR world champion.
