= Boyes, Montana =

Unincorporated community in Montana, United States

- Unincorporated village
- Interactive map of Boyes, Montana
- Coordinates: 45°16′5″N 105°1′52″W
- Country: United States
- State: Montana
- County: Carter
- Elevation: 3,327 ft (1,014 m)
- Time zone: Mountain (MST)
  - Summer (DST): MDT
- Postal code: 59316
- Area code: 406
- GNIS feature ID: 802052

Boyes is an unincorporated village in southwestern Carter County, Montana, United States. It lies along U.S. Route 212 southwest of the town of Ekalaka, the county seat of Carter County. Its elevation is 3,327 feet (1,014 m) and it is located at 45°16′5″N 105°1′52″W.

The town was named after Henry Edward Boyes, an early homesteader and stagecoach driver who stopped off to change horses. The town was originally located at the head of Scott Creek. In 1931, it was moved to be closer to U.S. Route 212. A post office, established in 1906, is still in operation serving ZIP code 59316.
