= Broadus, Montana =

- Town
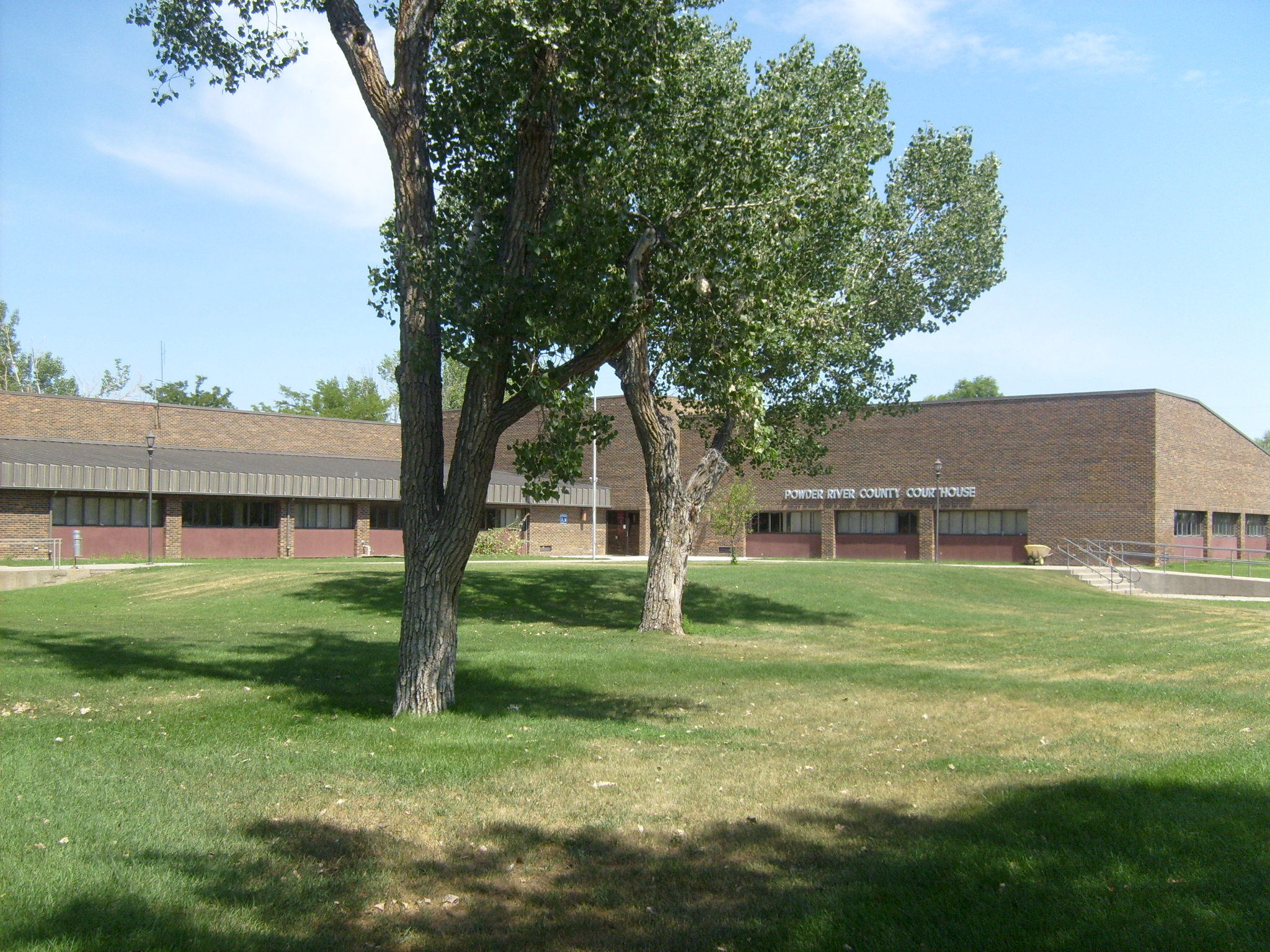
- Powder River County Courthouse
- Nickname: B-Town
- Location of Broadus, Montana
- Coordinates: 45°26′35″N 105°24′30″W
- Country: United States
- State: Montana
- County: Powder River

Government
  - Mayor: Chad Gatlin

Area
  - Total: 0.35 sq mi (0.91 km^{2})
  - Land: 0.35 sq mi (0.91 km^{2})
  - Water: 0 sq mi (0.00 km^{2})
- Elevation: 3,032 ft (924 m)

Population (2020)
  - Total: 456
  - Density: 1,295.6/sq mi (500.25/km^{2})
- Time zone: UTC-7 (Mountain (MST))
  - Summer (DST): UTC-6 (MDT)
- ZIP code: 59317
- Area code: 406
- FIPS code: 30-09700
- GNIS feature ID: 2411728
- Website: townofbroadus.com

Broadus is a town in and the county seat of Powder River County, Montana, United States. The population was 456 at the 2020 census.

== History ==
=== American Indian Wars ===
The Powder River Battles, part of the Powder River Expedition of 1865, were fought near the present-day town from September 1–15, 1865, by the U.S. Army against Sioux, Cheyenne, and Arapaho warriors. On March 17, 1876, the Battle of Powder River occurred about 34 miles (55 km) southwest of present-day Broadus, and on June 13, 1876, six companies of the 7th Cavalry led by Major Marcus Reno marched along the Powder River to within 10 miles (16 km) north of the town's present location before turning west toward the Little Bighorn.

=== Town ===
The Broadus post office was established in 1900, and named after the Broaddus family, early settlers in the area. When the town's streets were being planned, they were made wide enough for a horse-drawn carriage to turn around. The original streets are still this wide today. In 1918 publication of the Broadus Independent began, and is still published today, although it is now called the Powder River Examiner.

In 1920, Broadus was chosen as the county seat of the newly established Powder River County. As an incentive for voters choosing Broadus, Margaret Trautman promised a donation of 80 acres from her ranch to the town.

When Belle Creek Oil Field opened in the late 1960s, the economy of Broadus boomed. Oil and gas production continue to be important to the local economy.

== Geography ==
According to the United States Census Bureau, the town has a total area of 0.35 square miles (0.91 km^{2}), all land.

=== Climate ===
According to the Köppen Climate Classification system, Broadus has a semi-arid climate, abbreviated "BSk" on climate maps.

Broadus has a cold semi-arid climate due to its very dry winters. There are significant diurnal temperature variations throughout the year, and strong continental seasonal swings between the warm to hot summers and the cold winters.

Climate data for Broadus, Montana, 1991–2020 normals, extremes 1920–present
Month	Jan	Feb	Mar	Apr	May	Jun	Jul	Aug	Sep	Oct	Nov	Dec	Year
Record high °F (°C)	70 (21)	75 (24)	84 (29)	93 (34)	101 (38)	110 (43)	110 (43)	106 (41)	104 (40)	95 (35)	80 (27)	74 (23)	110 (43)
Mean maximum °F (°C)	55.0 (12.8)	57.8 (14.3)	72.1 (22.3)	80.7 (27.1)	87.5 (30.8)	95.0 (35.0)	101.3 (38.5)	99.7 (37.6)	95.2 (35.1)	83.4 (28.6)	69.0 (20.6)	54.9 (12.7)	102.0 (38.9)
Mean daily maximum °F (°C)	36.8 (2.7)	40.3 (4.6)	51.5 (10.8)	60.7 (15.9)	70.5 (21.4)	81.2 (27.3)	90.8 (32.7)	89.6 (32.0)	79.0 (26.1)	63.2 (17.3)	48.2 (9.0)	37.7 (3.2)	62.5 (16.9)
Daily mean °F (°C)	24.1 (−4.4)	27.4 (−2.6)	37.6 (3.1)	46.7 (8.2)	56.4 (13.6)	66.7 (19.3)	74.8 (23.8)	72.8 (22.7)	62.4 (16.9)	48.7 (9.3)	35.1 (1.7)	25.6 (−3.6)	48.2 (9.0)
Mean daily minimum °F (°C)	11.4 (−11.4)	14.4 (−9.8)	23.7 (−4.6)	32.6 (0.3)	42.3 (5.7)	52.1 (11.2)	58.8 (14.9)	56.1 (13.4)	45.8 (7.7)	34.2 (1.2)	22.1 (−5.5)	13.5 (−10.3)	33.9 (1.1)
Mean minimum °F (°C)	−15.1 (−26.2)	−9.1 (−22.8)	0.4 (−17.6)	15.2 (−9.3)	26.2 (−3.2)	38.7 (3.7)	48.5 (9.2)	42.8 (6.0)	30.9 (−0.6)	15.6 (−9.1)	−0.4 (−18.0)	−10.1 (−23.4)	−22.2 (−30.1)
Record low °F (°C)	−38 (−39)	−40 (−40)	−36 (−38)	−5 (−21)	12 (−11)	28 (−2)	35 (2)	28 (−2)	16 (−9)	−12 (−24)	−28 (−33)	−47 (−44)	−47 (−44)
Average precipitation inches (mm)	0.43 (11)	0.52 (13)	0.78 (20)	1.77 (45)	2.75 (70)	2.37 (60)	1.72 (44)	1.28 (33)	1.23 (31)	1.12 (28)	0.47 (12)	0.48 (12)	14.92 (379)
Average snowfall inches (cm)	9.7 (25)	7.2 (18)	2.7 (6.9)	3.6 (9.1)	0.8 (2.0)	0.0 (0.0)	0.0 (0.0)	0.0 (0.0)	0.0 (0.0)	1.5 (3.8)	4.4 (11)	4.1 (10)	34 (85.8)
Average precipitation days (≥ 0.01 in)	4.7	4.7	4.7	7.4	9.7	8.9	6.8	6.0	5.3	5.9	4.1	3.6	71.8
Average snowy days (≥ 0.1 in)	3.9	3.3	1.2	1.1	0.2	0.0	0.0	0.0	0.0	0.4	2.0	2.4	14.5
Source 1: NOAA
Source 2: National Weather Service

== Demographics ==
Historical population
Census	Pop.	Note	%±
1950	517		—
1960	628		21.5%
1970	799		27.2%
1980	712		−10.9%
1990	572		−19.7%
2000	451		−21.2%
2010	468		3.8%
2020	456		−2.6%
U.S. Decennial Census

=== 2010 census ===
As of the census of 2010, there were 468 people, 21 households, and 11 families living in the town. The population density was 1,376.5 inhabitants per square mile (531.5/km^{2}). There were 254 housing units at an average density of 747.1 per square mile (288.5/km^{2}). The racial makeup of the town was 95.1% White, 0.6% Native American, 0.4% Asian, 1.7% from other races, and 2.1% from two or more races. Hispanic or Latino of any race were 3.0% of the population.

There were 218 households, of which 22.9% had children under the age of 18 living with them, 42.7% were married couples living together, 6.4% had a female householder with no husband present, 3.2% had a male householder with no wife present, and 47.7% were non-families. 44.5% of all households were made up of individuals, and 24.3% had someone living alone who was 65 years of age or older. The average household size was 1.99 and the average family size was 2.80.

The median age in the town was 51.3 years. 20.3% of residents were under the age of 18; 4.5% were between the ages of 18 and 24; 16.1% were from 25 to 44; 27% were from 45 to 64; and 32.3% were 65 years of age or older. The gender makeup of the town was 46.2% male and 53.8% female.

=== 2000 census ===
As of the census of 2000, there were 451 people, 199 households, and 125 families living in the town. The population density was 1,379.2 inhabitants per square mile (532.5/km^{2}). There were 267 housing units at an average density of 816.5 per square mile (315.3/km^{2}). The racial makeup of the town was 98.45% White, 1.11% Native American, 0.22% Asian, and 0.22% from two or more races. Hispanic or Latino of any race were 1.11% of the population.

There were 199 households, out of which 28.1% had children under the age of 18 living with them, 52.3% were married couples living together, 7.5% had a female householder with no husband present, and 36.7% were non-families. 31.2% of all households were made up of individuals, and 16.1% had someone living alone who was 65 years of age or older. The average household size was 2.27 and the average family size was 2.86.

In the town, the population was spread out, with 26.2% under the age of 18, 6.0% from 18 to 24, 24.6% from 25 to 44, 23.1% from 45 to 64, and 20.2% who were 65 years of age or older. The median age was 41 years. For every 100 females there were 93.6 males. For every 100 females age 18 and over, there were 87.1 males.

The median income for a household in the town was $25,156, and the median income for a family was $30,417. Males had a median income of $22,813 versus $15,417 for females. The per capita income for the town was $15,938. About 13.6% of families and 14.5% of the population were below the poverty line, including 19.3% of those under age 18 and 14.0% of those age 65 or over.

== Infrastructure ==
Broadus Airport is a county-owned, public-use airport located three miles (5 km) northwest of town.

== Education ==
Broadus and Powder River County, Montana is served by the Powder River County High School, which is part of the Broadus Public School System, District No. 79J. They are known as the Hawks. In addition to the high school, Broadus Public Schools also operates an elementary and junior high school. As of November 1, 2014, the junior and senior high schools had a combined enrollment of 135 students. The elementary school had an enrollment of about 150 for the 2005–06 school year, in pre-kindergarten through sixth grade.

The Henry A. Malley Memorial Library is a public library serving the area.

== Media ==
The Powder River Examiner is the local newspaper. It is published weekly.

== Attractions ==
The Powder River Historical Museum includes many historical items, including a building housing "Mac's Museum", a large collection of seashells, minerals, and arrowheads, put together by Mac McCurdy. The Museum also has an original one-room schoolhouse, a pioneer cabin, jail cell, car barn, windmill, saddles, bits, spurs, displays representing early businesses, and a collection of artifacts from the Battle of Powder River.

The Powder River/Reynolds Battlefield is located on private land near the Powder River about 34 miles (55 km) southwest of present-day Broadus. The battlefield is accessible by Montana Secondary Highway 391, (Moorhead Road) on the west side of the Powder River. There is a rock monument with the headstones of four soldiers killed there as well as a small Northern Cheyenne memorial marking the site.

Annual events include a July 4 Celebration, County Fair in August, street dances, and a Christmas stroll early in December.

== Notable people ==
- Jess Lockwood, 2017 and 2019 PBR World champion attended Powder River County District High School.
- Lee Randall, Republican member of the Montana House of Representatives from 2009 until 2017.
