= National Register of Historic Places listings in Fergus County, Montana =

Location of Fergus County in Montana

This is a list of the National Register of Historic Places listings in Fergus County, Montana. It is intended to be a complete list of the properties and districts on the National Register of Historic Places in Fergus County, Montana, United States. The locations of National Register properties and districts for which the latitude and longitude coordinates are included below, may be seen in a map.

There are 47 properties and districts listed on the National Register in the county.

This National Park Service list is complete through NPS recent listings posted October 23, 2026.

== Listings county-wide ==
	Name on the Register	Image	Date listed	Location	City or town	Description
1	Anderson House	Anderson House	January 27, 1993 (#92001770)	1015 W. Watson; 47°03′32″N 109°25′54″W	Lewistown	
2	Ayers House	Ayers House	January 10, 1986 (#86000061)	316 8th Ave., S. 47°04′06″N 109°25′39″W	Lewistown	
3	Bear Gulch		October 28, 2026 (#100013304)	2649 Fairview Road; 46°57′57″N 109°01′47″W	Forest Grove vicinity	
4	Bright House	Bright House	January 27, 1993 (#92001766)	707 W. Boulevard; 47°03′50″N 109°25′56″W	Lewistown	
5	Clark–Cardwell House	Clark–Cardwell House	January 10, 1986 (#86000063)	523 W. Watson; 47°03′40″N 109°25′34″W	Lewistown	
6	Culver Studio	Culver Studio	August 11, 1980 (#80002412)	212 5th Ave. 47°03′49″N 109°25′43″W	Lewistown	
7	Draft Horse Barn, Fergus County Fairgrounds		December 14, 2017 (#100001895)	1000 US 191; 47°05′01″N 109°25′47″W	Lewistown	
8	Fergus County High School	Fergus County High School	June 27, 1985 (#85001409)	412 6th Ave., S. 47°03′37″N 109°25′33″W	Lewistown	
9	Fergus County Improvement Corporation Dormitory	Fergus County Improvement Corporation Dormitory	February 1, 1980 (#80002413)	216 7th St., S. 47°03′37″N 109°25′41″W	Lewistown	
10	First Presbyterian Church	First Presbyterian Church	January 10, 1986 (#86000065)	215 5th Ave., S. 47°03′45″N 109°25′30″W	Lewistown	
11	Gamble–Robinson Company Warehouse	Gamble–Robinson Company Warehouse	April 17, 2017 (#100000888)	302 E. Main St. 47°04′07″N 109°25′18″W	Lewistown	
12	Frank Hagadone Homestead	Frank Hagadone Homestead	January 29, 2009 (#08001384)	20 miles (32 km) north of Winifred, near Mile 97 on the Missouri River; 47°43′45″N 109°28′35″W	Winifred vicinity	
13	Abraham and Mary Walton Hogeland House	Abraham and Mary Walton Hogeland House	May 24, 2007 (#07000465)	620 W. Montana St. 47°03′55″N 109°25′57″W	Lewistown	
14	House at 301 Eighth Avenue, South	House at 301 Eighth Avenue, South	January 10, 1986 (#86000066)	301 8th Ave., S. 47°03′23″N 109°25′39″W	Lewistown	
15	House at 324 W. Corcoran	House at 324 W. Corcoran	January 27, 1993 (#92001773)	324 W. Corcoran; 47°04′07″N 109°25′52″W	Lewistown	
16	House at 618 West Janeaux	House at 618 West Janeaux	January 10, 1986 (#86000062)	618 W. Janeaux; 47°03′44″N 109°25′35″W	Lewistown	
17	House at 805 W. Watson	House at 805 W. Watson	January 27, 1993 (#92001767)	805 W. Watson; 47°03′38″N 109°25′46″W	Lewistown	
18	House at 809 W. Watson	House at 809 W. Watson	January 27, 1993 (#92001768)	809 W. Watson; 47°03′38″N 109°25′45″W	Lewistown	
19	House at 813 W. Watson	House at 813 W. Watson	January 27, 1993 (#92001769)	813 W. Watson; 47°03′39″N 109°25′45″W	Lewistown	
20	Huntoon Residence	Huntoon Residence	June 27, 1985 (#85001408)	722 W. Water; 47°03′24″N 109°25′38″W	Lewistown	
21	Judith Landing Historic District	Judith Landing Historic District	December 6, 1975 (#75001081)	Missouri River at Montana Highway 236 in Upper Missouri River Breaks National Monument; 47°44′18″N 109°37′33″W	Winifred	Extends into Chouteau County. Boundary increase on 2014-04-11.
22	Judith Place Historic District	Judith Place Historic District	May 4, 1988 (#88000465)	Roughly bounded by Main St., the alley between Hawthorne and Ridgelawn Sts., Washington St., and Oullette St. 47°04′16″N 109°25′01″W	Lewistown	
23	Lewis House	Lewis House	January 27, 1993 (#92001765)	702 W. Boulevard; 47°03′52″N 109°25′56″W	Lewistown	
24	Lewistown Carnegie Library	Lewistown Carnegie Library	August 11, 1980 (#80002411)	701 W. Main St. 47°03′41″N 109°25′47″W	Lewistown	
25	Lewistown Central Business Historic District	Lewistown Central Business Historic District	June 27, 1985 (#85001405)	Roughly bounded by Washington St., 1st Ave., Janeaux St., and 8th Ave. 47°03′53″N 109°25′44″W	Lewistown	
26	Lewistown Courthouse Historic District	Lewistown Courthouse Historic District	June 27, 1985 (#85001406)	Roughly bounded by Washington St., 6th Ave., Main and Broadway Sts. 47°03′42″N 109°25′50″W	Lewistown	
27	Lewistown Mercantile Company	Lewistown Mercantile Company	February 3, 1986 (#86000064)	220 E. Main; 47°04′03″N 109°25′20″W	Lewistown	
28	Lewistown Satellite Airfield Historic District	Lewistown Satellite Airfield Historic District	March 8, 2000 (#00000162)	Aztec and Horizon Drives; 47°02′50″N 109°27′30″W	Lewistown	Surviving buildings of WW2 airfield at Lewistown Municipal Airport. Boundary increase approved May 1, 2018.
29	Lewistown Silk Stocking District	Lewistown Silk Stocking District	June 27, 1985 (#85001407)	Roughly bounded by 2nd Ave., Boulevard and Washington Sts. and 3rd Ave. 47°03′58″N 109°25′36″W	Lewistown	
30	Manley's General Store		November 5, 2024 (#100011024)	42 Garneill Road; 46°45′03″N 109°45′01″W	Garneill	
31	Masonic Temple	Masonic Temple	July 3, 1979 (#79001401)	322 W. Broadway St. 47°03′53″N 109°25′35″W	Lewistown	
32	Mill House		January 27, 1993 (#92001764)	Montana Highway 466 4.5 miles (7.2 km) southeast of Lewistown, along Spring Creek; 47°01′10″N 109°21′26″W	Lewistown	
33	N-Bar Ranch		July 9, 1991 (#91000881)	15 miles (24 km) southwest of Grass Range; 46°51′16″N 108°56′19″W	Grass Range vicinity	
34	Naylor Brothers Ranch Historic District		December 30, 2008 (#08001261)	503 E. Dry Creek Rd. 46°48′37″N 109°44′49″W	Buffalo vicinity	
35	Gus Nelson Homestead		March 21, 2011 (#11000093)	Missouri River, River Mile 129.4-131.1; west side of river 47°45′07″N 108°55′59″W	Cow Island vicinity	
36	Reed and Bowles Trading Post	Reed and Bowles Trading Post	August 5, 2010 (#10000520)	Joyland Rd. 47°05′16″N 109°27′25″W	Lewistown vicinity	
37	Reed's Fort Post Office	Reed's Fort Post Office	August 10, 2010 (#10000545)	.1 miles (0.16 km) southwest from the junction of Brassey St. and 6th Ave. on Casino Creek Dr. 47°03′30″N 109°25′27″W	Lewistown	
38	Fred Robinson Bridge	Fred Robinson Bridge	March 26, 2012 (#12000171)	Milepost 88, US 191, 51 miles (82 km) north of Lewistown; 47°37′51″N 108°41′06″W	Lewistown vicinity	Montana's Steel Stringer and Steel Girder Bridges Multiple Property Submission; extends into Phillips County
39	Rocky Point		May 21, 1975 (#75001082)	30 miles (48 km) south of Landusky in the Charles M. Russell National Wildlife Refuge; 47°36′23″N 108°26′41″W	Landusky vicinity	
40	St. James Episcopal Church and Parish House	St. James Episcopal Church and Parish House	November 16, 1978 (#78001683)	502 W. Montana St. 47°03′55″N 109°25′51″W	Lewistown	
41	St. Joseph's Hospital	St. Joseph's Hospital	September 13, 1978 (#78001684)	Fountain Terrace Dr. and S. High St. 47°04′06″N 109°25′06″W	Lewistown	Now converted to housing.
42	St. Leo's Catholic Church	St. Leo's Catholic Church	May 6, 1982 (#82003163)	124 W. Broadway; 47°03′58″N 109°25′29″W	Lewistown	
43	St. Wenceslaus Catholic Church	St. Wenceslaus Catholic Church	May 19, 2014 (#14000221)	7724 Danvers Road; 47°13′28″N 109°43′03″W	Danvers	
44	Schroeder Hospital	Schroeder Hospital	January 27, 1993 (#92001771)	502 5th Ave., S. 47°03′45″N 109°25′30″W	Lewistown	
45	Stafford's Grocery	Stafford's Grocery	April 5, 2016 (#16000141)	201 Main St. 47°33′34″N 109°22′35″W	Winifred	
46	Symmes Park Missile	Symmes Park Missile	March 24, 2021 (#100006312)	Symmes Park, NE Main St. 47°04′15″N 109°24′53″W	Lewistown	
47	U.S. Post Office and Federal Building – Lewistown	U.S. Post Office and Federal Building – Lewistown	March 14, 1986 (#86000684)	204 3rd Ave., N. 47°03′55″N 109°25′34″W	Lewistown	

== See also ==
- List of National Historic Landmarks in Montana
- National Register of Historic Places listings in Montana
