= List of census-designated places in Montana =

Map of the United States with Montana highlighted

This article lists census-designated places (CDPs) in the U.S. state of Montana. As of 2020, there were a total of 369 census-designated places in Montana.

== Census-designated places ==
CDP	Population	County
Absarokee	1,000	Stillwater
Acton	48	Yellowstone
Alder	86	Madison
Alzada	25	Carter
Amsterdam	206	Gallatin
Antelope	74	Sheridan
Arlee	720	Lake
Argenta	35	Beaverhead
Ashland	773	Rosebud
Augusta	316	Lewis and Clark
Avon	114	Powell
Ayers Ranch Colony	12	Fergus
Azure	314	Hill
Babb	130	Glacier
Ballantine	293	Yellowstone
Basin	199	Jefferson
Batavia	368	Flathead
Bear Dance	281	Lake
Beaver Creek	311	Hill
Belfry	193	Carbon
Belknap	161	Sanders
Biddle	28	Powder River
Big Arm	218	Lake
Bigfork	5,118	Flathead
Big Sky	3,591	Gallatin and Madison
Big Sky Colony	0	Glacier
Big Stone Colony	78	Cascade
Birch Creek Colony	120	Pondera
Birney	97	Rosebud
Black Eagle	949	Cascade
Blackfoot	109	Glacier
Bloomfield	6	Dawson
Boneau	365	Chouteau
Bonner-West Riverside	1,690	Missoula
Box Elder	85	Hill
Boyd	19	Carbon
Brady	116	Pondera
Brandon	46	Madison
Bridger	72	Gallatin
Brockton	358	Roosevelt
Brockway	14	McCone
Brooks	18	Fergus
Bull Lake	180	Lincoln
Busby	719	Big Horn
Bynum	28	Teton
Camas	57	Sanders
Camp Three	138	Musselshell
Camrose Colony	184	Toole
Canyon Creek	47	Lewis and Clark
Cardwell	62	Jefferson
Carlton	721	Missoula
Carter	65	Chouteau
Cascade Colony	115	Cascade
Centerville	32	Cascade
Charlo	385	Lake
Charlos Heights	135	Ravalli
Churchill	1,030	Gallatin
Clancy	1,851	Jefferson
Clinton	1,018	Missoula
Coffee Creek	22	Fergus
Condon	285	Missoula
Conner	182	Ravalli
Cooke City	77	Park
Coram	572	Flathead
Corvallis	1,125	Ravalli
Corwin Springs	101	Park
Craig	39	Lewis and Clark
Crane	91	Richland
Crow Agency	1,657	Big Horn
Custer	119	Yellowstone
Cyr	63	Mineral
Danvers	16	Fergus
Dayton	104	Lake
De Borgia	91	Mineral
Deerfield Colony	48	Fergus
Dell	17	Beaverhead
Dewey	25	Beaverhead
Duncan Ranch Colony	7	Wheatland
Dupuyer	93	Pondera
Eagle Creek Colony	164	Liberty
East End Colony	8	Hill
East Glacier Park	354	Glacier
East Malta Colony	97	Phillips
East Missoula	2,465	Missoula
Edgar	110	Carbon
Elkhorn	12	Jefferson
Elliston	227	Powell
Elmo	244	Lake
Emigrant	465	Park
Essex	44	Flathead
Evaro	374	Missoula
Evergreen	8,149	Flathead
Fair Haven Colony	0	Cascade
Fallon	122	Prairie
Finley Point	532	Lake
Fishtail	67	Stillwater
Flat Willow Colony	15	Musselshell
Florence	821	Ravalli
Floweree	19	Chouteau
Fords Creek Colony	5	Fergus
Forest Hill Village	241	Flathead
Fort Belknap Agency	1,567	Blaine
Fort Shaw	256	Cascade
Fort Smith	170	Big Horn
Fortine	317	Lincoln
Forty Mile Colony	28	Big Horn
Four Corners	5,901	Gallatin
Fox	100	Carbon
Fox Lake	231	Richland
Frazer	354	Valley
Frenchtown	1,958	Missoula
Gallatin Gateway	967	Gallatin
Gallatin River Ranch	117	Gallatin
Gardiner	833	Park
Garrison	115	Powell
Geyser	78	Judith Basin
Gibson Flats	203	Cascade
Gildford	141	Hill
Gildford Colony	73	Hill
Gilman	48	Lewis and Clark
Glacier Colony	102	Glacier
Glen	28	Beaverhead
Glendale Colony	97	Glacier
Goldcreek	9	Powell
Golden Valley Colony	4	Golden Valley
Grant	19	Beaverhead
Greycliff	89	Sweet Grass
Hall	51	Granite
Happys Inn	179	Lincoln
Hardy	88	Cascade
Harrison	105	Madison
Hartland Colony	0	Blaine
Haugan	58	Mineral
Havre North	726	Hill
Hays	996	Blaine
Heart Butte	621	Pondera
Hebgen Lake Estates	123	Gallatin
Helena Flats	1,206	Flathead
Helena Valley Northeast	3,813	Lewis and Clark
Helena Valley Northwest	4,705	Lewis and Clark
Helena Valley Southeast	9,168	Lewis and Clark
Helena Valley West Central	8,670	Lewis and Clark
Helena West Side	1,331	Lewis and Clark
Helmville	38	Powell
Heron	173	Sanders
Herron	88	Hill
Hidden Lake Colony	99	Glacier
Highwood	165	Chouteau
Hilger	24	Fergus
Hilldale Colony	130	Hill
Hillside Colony	0	Toole
Hinsdale	193	Valley
Hogeland	14	Blaine
Homestead	35	Sheridan
Horizon Colony	13	Glacier
Hungry Horse	891	Flathead
Huntley	442	Yellowstone
Huson	256	Missoula
Indian Springs	85	Lincoln
Inverness	77	Hill
Jackson	36	Beaverhead
Jardine	47	Park
Jeffers	25	Madison
Jefferson City	597	Jefferson
Jette	273	Lake
Joplin	159	Liberty
Kerr	273	Lake
Kicking Horse	76	Lake
Kila	424	Flathead
Kilby Butte Colony	0	Musselshell
King Arthur Park	1,549	Gallatin
King Ranch Colony	57	Fergus
Kings Point	201	Lake
Kingsbury Colony	96	Pondera
Klein	163	Musselshell
Kremlin	78	Hill
Lake Mary Ronan	53	Lake
Lakeside	2,705	Flathead
Lakeview	15	Beaverhead
Lame Deer	1,897	Rosebud
Landusky	22	Phillips
Laredo	37	Hill
Lewistown Heights	364	Fergus
Lincoln	998	Lewis and Clark
Lindisfarne	320	Lake
Lindsay	12	Dawson
Little Bitterroot Lake	154	Flathead
Little Browning	218	Glacier
Lockwood	7,195	Yellowstone
Lodge Pole	265	Blaine
Logan	72	Gallatin
Lolo	4,399	Missoula
Loma	65	Chouteau
Lonepine	177	Sanders
Loring Colony	48	Phillips
Luther	30	Carbon
Malmstrom Air Force Base	4,131	Cascade
Mammoth	4	Madison
Marion	1,119	Flathead
Martin City	461	Flathead
Martinsdale	43	Meagher
Martinsdale Colony	97	Wheatland
Marysville	82	Lewis and Clark
Maverick Mountain	67	Beaverhead
Maxville	138	Granite
McAllister	278	Madison
Midway Colony	100	Pondera
Milford Colony	2	Lewis and Clark
Miller Colony	9	Teton
Moccasin	23	Judith Basin
Monarch	26	Cascade
Montana City	2,918	Jefferson
Montaqua	120	Carbon
Mountain View Colony	125	Yellowstone
Muddy	646	Big Horn
Musselshell	59	Musselshell
New Miami Colony	297	Pondera
New Rockport Colony	194	Teton
Niarada	28	Flathead, Lake, and Sanders
Nibbe	71	Yellowstone
Norris	46	Madison
North Browning	2,653	Glacier
North Harlem Colony	26	Blaine
Noxon	255	Sanders
Nye	38	Stillwater
Old Agency	81	Sanders
Olney	186	Flathead
Orchard Homes	5,377	Missoula
Ovando	83	Powell
Pablo	2,138	Lake
Paradise	166	Sanders
Park City	1,023	Stillwater
Parker School	388	Chouteau and Hill
Peerless	23	Daniels
Pendroy	25	Teton
Piltzville	372	Missoula
Pine Creek	80	Park
Pinnacle	45	Flathead
Pioneer Junction	902	Lincoln
Pleasant Valley Colony	130	Cascade
Polebridge	31	Flathead
Pompeys Pillar	51	Yellowstone
Pondera Colony	113	Pondera
Ponderosa Pines	665	Gallatin
Pony	127	Madison
Potomac	26	Missoula
Power	177	Teton
Prairie Elk Colony	0	McCone
Pray	790	Park
Pryor	637	Big Horn
Racetrack	42	Powell
Rader Creek	341	Jefferson
Radersburg	61	Broadwater
Rapelje	88	Stillwater
Ravalli	85	Lake
Raynesford	31	Judith Basin
Redstone	13	Sheridan
Reed Point	177	Stillwater
Reserve	33	Sheridan
Rhodes	146	Flathead
Riceville	36	Cascade
Rimini	51	Lewis and Clark
Rimrock Colony	105	Toole
Riverbend	455	Mineral
Riverview Colony	100	Liberty
Roberts	304	Carbon
Rockport Colony	0	Teton
Rockvale	193	Carbon
Rocky Boy West	1,042	Chouteau and Hill
Rocky Boy's Agency	404	Hill
Rocky Point	111	Lake
Rollins	192	Lake
Roscoe	16	Carbon
Rosebud	67	Rosebud
Roy	96	Fergus
Rudyard	270	Hill
Saddle Butte	151	Hill
Sage Creek Colony	81	Liberty
Saltese	10	Mineral
Sand Coulee	179	Cascade
Sangrey	316	Hill
Santa Rita	107	Glacier
Sapphire Ridge	26	Judith Basin
Savage	303	Richland
Sčilíp	221	Sanders
Sedan	101	Gallatin
Seeley Lake	1,682	Missoula
Seville Colony	0	Glacier
Shawmut	42	Wheatland
Shepherd	507	Yellowstone
Silesia	103	Carbon
Silver Gate	19	Park
Silver Star	46	Madison
Simms	361	Cascade
Sleeping Buffalo	12	Phillips
Snowslip	39	Flathead
Somers	1,049	Flathead
South Browning	1,970	Glacier
South Glastonbury	277	Park
South Hills	644	Jefferson
Spokane Creek	430	Broadwater
Spring Creek Colony	33	Fergus
Springdale	40	Park
Springdale Colony	0	Meagher
Springhill	120	Gallatin
Springwater Colony	119	Wheatland
Square Butte	27	Chouteau
St. Marie	489	Valley
St. Mary	54	Glacier
St. Pierre	364	Hill
St. Regis	313	Mineral
St. Xavier	78	Big Horn
Starr School	267	Glacier
Stockett	157	Cascade
Stryker	25	Lincoln
Sula	41	Ravalli
Sun Prairie	1,615	Cascade
Sun River	95	Cascade
Sunnybrook Colony	0	Chouteau
Surprise Creek Colony	8	Judith Basin
Swan Lake	102	Lake
Sweet Grass	65	Toole
Sylvanite	98	Lincoln
The Silos	691	Broadwater
Toston	100	Broadwater
Tracy	196	Cascade
Trego	515	Lincoln
Trout Creek	277	Sanders
Turah	364	Missoula
Turner	90	Blaine
Turner Colony	135	Blaine
Turtle Lake	251	Lake
Twin Creeks	164	Missoula
Twin Hills Colony	39	Chouteau
Twodot	26	Wheatland
Ulm	723	Cascade
Unionville	206	Lewis and Clark
Utica	23	Judith Basin
Vaughn	737	Cascade
Victor	789	Ravalli
Vida	24	McCone
Warm Spring Creek	18	Fergus
Weeksville	81	Sanders
West Glacier	221	Flathead
West Glendive	1,998	Dawson
West Havre	290	Hill
West Kootenai	422	Lincoln
Wheatland	1,103	Broadwater
White Haven	499	Lincoln
Whitetail	9	Daniels
Whitewater	75	Phillips
Whitlash	4	Liberty
Willow Creek	230	Gallatin
Wilsall	197	Park
Windham	43	Judith Basin
Wineglass	280	Park
Winston	169	Broadwater
Wisdom	104	Beaverhead
Wise River	42	Beaverhead
Wolf Creek	25	Lewis and Clark
Woods Bay	676	Lake
Worden	582	Yellowstone
Wye	714	Missoula
Wyola	190	Big Horn
Yaak	338	Lincoln
York	94	Lewis and Clark
Zenith Colony	0	Glacier
Zortman	82	Phillips
Zurich	29	Blaine

== See also ==
- List of cities and towns in Montana
- List of counties in Montana
