= Fords Creek Colony, Montana =

- Census-designated place
- Location within Montana Location within the United States
- Coordinates: 47°07′52″N 108°55′00″W
- Country: United States
- State: Montana
- County: Fergus

Area
  - Total: 0.17 sq mi (0.45 km^{2})
  - Land: 0.17 sq mi (0.45 km^{2})
  - Water: 0 sq mi (0.00 km^{2})
- Elevation: 3,560 ft (1,090 m)

Population (2020)
  - Total: 5
  - Density: 28.7/sq mi (11.07/km^{2})
- Time zone: UTC-7 (Mountain (MST))
  - Summer (DST): UTC-6 (MDT)
- ZIP Code: 59032 (Grass Range)
- Area code: 406
- FIPS code: 30-27360
- GNIS feature ID: 2804288

Fords Creek Colony is a Hutterite community and census-designated place (CDP) in Fergus County, Montana, United States. It is in the eastern part of the county, 12 miles (19 km) northwest of Grass Range and 29 miles (47 km) northeast of Lewistown.

The community was first listed as a CDP prior to the 2020 census. As of the 2020 census, Fords Creek Colony had a population of 5.

== Demographics ==
Historical population
Census	Pop.	Note	%±
2020	5		—
U.S. Decennial Census
