= Amherst, Montana =

Unincorporated community in Montana, U.S.

Coordinates: 47°08′59″N 109°37′30″W

Amherst is an unincorporated community in Fergus County, in the U.S. state of Montana.

Big Spring Creek flows near town.

== History ==
The community was named after Amherst, Massachusetts.
