= Deerfield Colony =

Deerfield Colony may refer to a Hutterite colony in the United States:

- Deerfield Colony, Montana
- Deerfield Colony, South Dakota
