= Spring Creek Colony, Montana =

- Census-designated place
- Location within Montana Location within the United States
- Coordinates: 47°09′21″N 109°37′23″W
- Country: United States
- State: Montana
- County: Fergus

Area
  - Total: 0.69 sq mi (1.80 km^{2})
  - Land: 0.69 sq mi (1.80 km^{2})
  - Water: 0 sq mi (0.00 km^{2})
- Elevation: 3,514 ft (1,071 m)

Population (2020)
  - Total: 33
  - Density: 47/sq mi (18.3/km^{2})
- Time zone: UTC-7 (Mountain (MST))
  - Summer (DST): UTC-6 (MDT)
- ZIP Code: 59457 (Lewistown)
- Area code: 406
- FIPS code: 30-70000
- GNIS feature ID: 2804291

Spring Creek Colony is a Hutterite community and census-designated place (CDP) in Fergus County, Montana, United States. It is in the western part of the county, along Big Spring Creek, a northwest-flowing tributary of the Judith River, which in turn flows north to the Missouri River. The colony sits at the western foot of the South Moccasin Mountains and is 14 miles (23 km) northwest of Lewistown, the Fergus county seat.

As of the 2020 census, Spring Creek Colony had a population of 33.

Spring Creek Colony was first listed as a CDP prior to the 2020 census.

== Demographics ==
Historical population
| Census | Pop. | Note | %± |
|---|---|---|---|
| 2020 | 33 | | — |
U.S. Decennial Census
