= Hoosic =

Hoosac is an Algonquian word meaning place of stones.

Hoosic, Hoosick or Hoosac may refer to:

== Communities ==
- Hoosac, Montana, an unincorporated community in Fergus County
- Hoosick, New York, a town in Rensselaer County
  - Hoosick Falls, New York, a village in the above town

== Geography ==
- Hoosac Range, a mountain range in Western Massachusetts
- Hoosic River, a tributary of the Hudson River

== Other ==
- Hoosac School, an Episcopalian private school in Hoosick, New York
- Hoosac Tunnel, also called Hoosic or Hoosick Tunnel, in Massachusetts
- Hoosick Street, a street in Troy, New York
