= Spring Creek Colony =

Spring Creek Colony may refer to:

- Spring Creek Colony, Montana
- Spring Creek Colony, South Dakota
