= Ayers House =

Ayers House may refer to:

in Australia

- Ayers House (Adelaide), South Australia

in the United States

- William Ayers House, Fort Smith, AR, listed on the NRHP in Arkansas
- Ayers-Little Boarding House, Carnesville, GA, listed on the NRHP in Georgia
- Ayers House (Lewistown, Montana), listed on the NRHP in Montana
- Ayers–Allen House, Metuchen, NJ, listed on the NRHP in New Jersey
