= Ayers Ranch Colony, Montana =

- Census-designated place
- Location within Montana Location within the United States
- Coordinates: 47°03′04″N 108°56′43″W
- Country: United States
- State: Montana
- County: Fergus

Area
  - Total: 0.44 sq mi (1.14 km^{2})
  - Land: 0.44 sq mi (1.14 km^{2})
  - Water: 0 sq mi (0.00 km^{2})
- Elevation: 3,599 ft (1,097 m)

Population (2020)
  - Total: 12
  - Density: 27.2/sq mi (10.52/km^{2})
- Time zone: UTC-7 (Mountain (MST))
  - Summer (DST): UTC-6 (MDT)
- ZIP Code: 59032 (Grass Range)
- Area code: 406
- FIPS code: 30-03196
- GNIS feature ID: 2804283

Ayers Ranch Colony is a Hutterite community and census-designated place (CDP) in Fergus County, Montana, United States. It is in the southeastern part of the county, on the north side of U.S. Route 87/Montana Highway 200, 8 miles (13 km) west of Grass Range and 24 miles (39 km) east of Lewistown. The North Fork of McDonald Creek runs through the community, part of the Musselshell River watershed leading to the Missouri River.

The community was first listed as a CDP prior to the 2020 census. As of the 2020 census, Ayers Ranch Colony had a population of 12.

== Demographics ==
Historical population
Census	Pop.	Note	%±
2020	12		—
U.S. Decennial Census
