= Silk Stocking District =

Silk Stocking District may refer to:

- Silk Stocking District (Talladega), in Talladega, Alabama, a historic district listed on the National Register of Historic Places (NRHP)
- The Silk Stocking National Historic District, one of six historic districts in Galveston, Texas
- Lewistown Silk Stocking District, Lewistown, Montana, NRHP-listed
- Upper East Side, New York City, also known as the Silk Stocking District
