= Lewistown Federal Building & Post Office =

- U.S. Post Office and Federal Building – Lewistown
- U.S. National Register of Historic Places
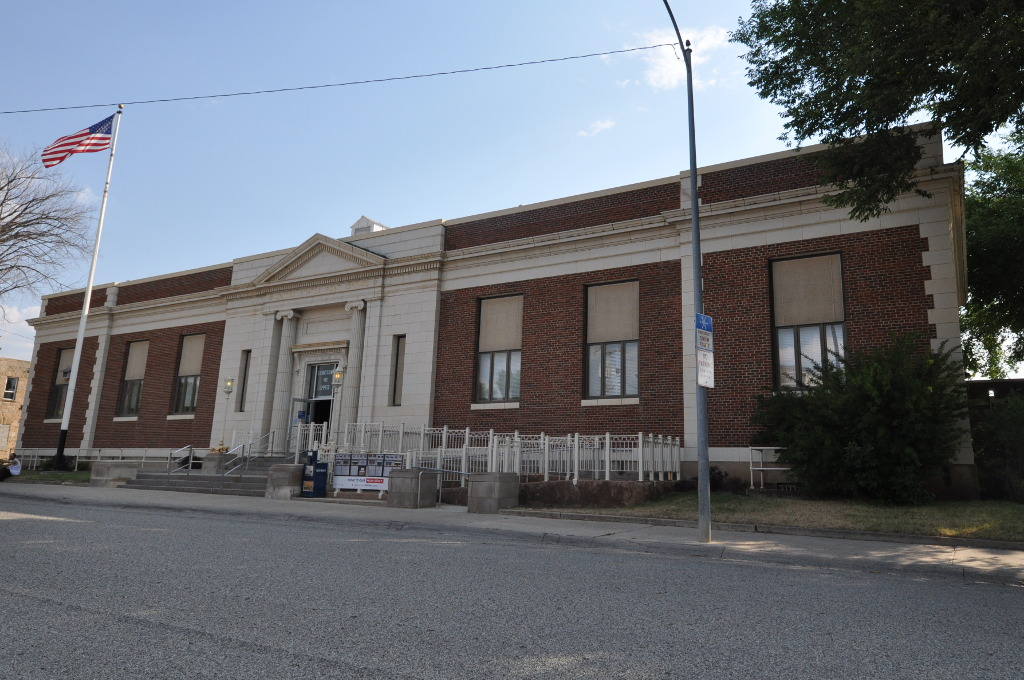

- Location within Montana Location within the United States
- Location: 204 Third Ave. N, Lewistown, Montana
- Coordinates: 47°3′55″N 109°25′34″W
- Area: 1 acre (0.40 ha)
- Built: 1931
- Built by: McGough Bros.
- Architect: Wetmore, James A.
- Architectural style: Beaux Arts, Late Beaux Arts
- MPS: US Post Offices in Montana, 1900--1941, TR
- NRHP reference No.: 86000684
- Added to NRHP: March 14, 1986

The Lewistown Federal Building & Post Office, also known as the Lewistown Main Post Office, is located at 204 Third Ave. N. in Lewistown in Fergus County, Montana. It was built in 1931. It was listed on the National Register of Historic Places in 1986 as U.S. Post Office and Federal Building – Lewistown.

Its design is credited to James A. Wetmore. It was built by the McGough Bros. firm of Illinois.

It is Beaux Arts or Late Beaux Arts in style.

The building was dedicated in a ceremony attended by almost 1,000 persons, on November 25, 1931.
