= Warm Springs Creek =

Warm Springs Creek may refer to:

- Warm Springs Creek (California)
- Warm Springs Creek (Montana), near Warm Springs, Montana
- Warm Springs Creek (Idaho)

== See also ==
- Warm Spring Creek, Montana
