= Judith Landing Historic District =

Historic district in Montana, United States

- U.S. National Register of Historic Places
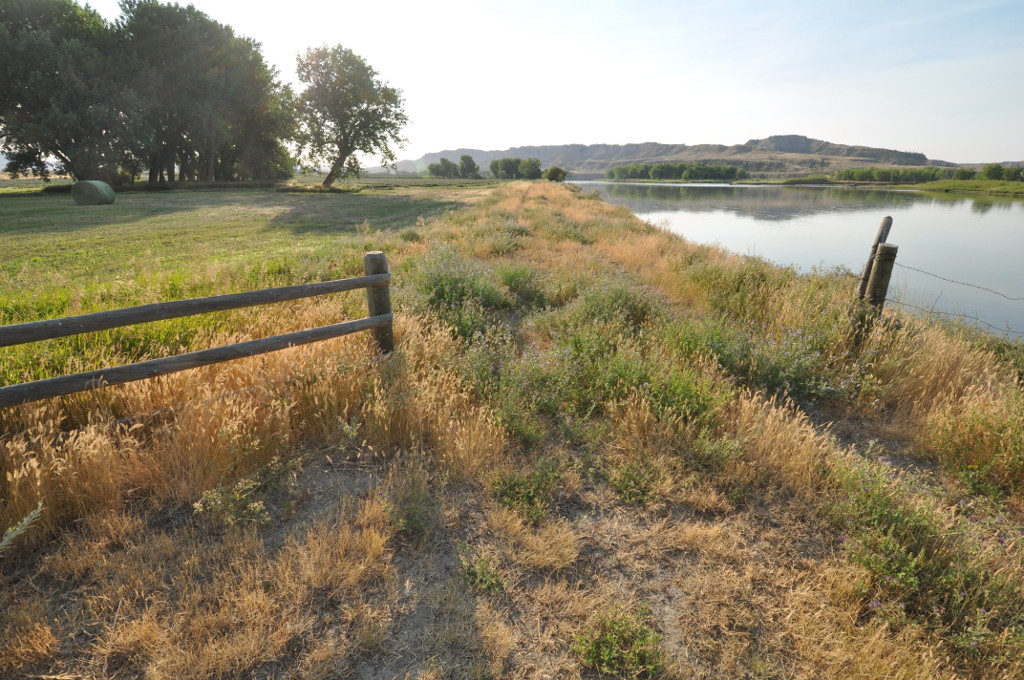

- Location within Montana
- Location: Dog Creek Road, Upper Missouri River Breaks National Monument, near Winifred, Montana
- Coordinates: 47.737361°N 109.626104°W
- Area: 9,555 acres (38.67 km^{2})
- NRHP reference No.: 75001081 (original); 14000143 (increase)

Significant dates
- Added to NRHP: December 6, 1975
- Boundary increase: April 11, 2014

The Judith Landing Historic District is a historic district near Winifred, Montana which was listed on the National Register of Historic Places in 1975. It is large, 9,555 acres (38.67 km^{2}) in size, spanning parts of Choteau and Fergus counties, including the confluences of the Judith River and Dog Creek into the Missouri River.

It includes the Hayden Site, site in 1855 of the first discovery of dinosaur skeletal remains in the Western hemisphere.

The district was expanded in 2014 in a boundary increase NRHP listing. It includes archeological sites and was listed for its interpretive potential.

It is along the Missouri River and includes a Corps of Discovery campsite of May 28, 1805 of the Lewis and Clark expedition.

It is a historic site managed by BLM, and extends into Fergus County.

The listing included eight contributing buildings, 37 contributing sites, and a contributing object.

In January 2025, a 109.43-acre parcel within the historic district became Judith Landing State Park.
