= Lewistown Heights, Montana =

- Census-designated place
- Location of Lewistown Heights, Montana
- Coordinates: 47°4′32″N 109°27′21″W
- Country: United States
- State: Montana
- County: Fergus

Area
  - Total: 2.36 sq mi (6.10 km^{2})
  - Land: 2.36 sq mi (6.10 km^{2})
  - Water: 0 sq mi (0.00 km^{2})
- Elevation: 4,009 ft (1,222 m)

Population (2020)
  - Total: 364
  - Density: 154.4/sq mi (59.62/km^{2})
- Time zone: UTC-7 (Mountain (MST))
  - Summer (DST): UTC-6 (MDT)
- Area code: 406
- FIPS code: 30-43400
- GNIS feature ID: 2408604

Lewistown Heights is an unincorporated area and census-designated place (CDP) in Fergus County, Montana, United States. As of the 2020 census, Lewistown Heights had a population of 364.

== Geography ==
Lewistown Heights is located northwest of Lewistown, the county seat. It is bordered to the south by Valach Road, to the east by Joyland Road, to the north by Wolverine Creek Road, and to the west by Wolverine Creek. Downtown Lewistown is 1.5 miles (2.4 km) to the southeast.

According to the United States Census Bureau, the CDP has a total area of 2.4 square miles (6.1 km^{2}), all land.

== Demographics ==
Historical population
Census	Pop.	Note	%±
2020	364		—
U.S. Decennial Census

As of the census of 2000, there were 365 people, 138 households, and 93 families residing in the CDP. The population density was 155.6 inhabitants per square mile (60.1/km^{2}). There were 149 housing units at an average density of 63.5 per square mile (24.5/km^{2}). The racial makeup of the CDP was 94.52% White, 1.64% African American, 1.37% Native American, 1.64% from other races, and 0.82% from two or more races. Hispanic or Latino of any race were 1.64% of the population.

There were 138 households, out of which 32.6% had children under the age of 18 living with them, 57.2% were married couples living together, 5.8% had a female householder with no husband present, and 31.9% were non-families. 18.8% of all households were made up of individuals, and 8.7% had someone living alone who was 65 years of age or older. The average household size was 2.64 and the average family size was 3.13.

In the CDP, the population was spread out, with 29.0% under the age of 18, 6.0% from 18 to 24, 28.8% from 25 to 44, 24.7% from 45 to 64, and 11.5% who were 65 years of age or older. The median age was 37 years. For every 100 females, there were 92.1 males. For every 100 females age 18 and over, there were 107.2 males.

The median income for a household in the CDP was $31,154, and the median income for a family was $34,063. Males had a median income of $28,382 versus $13,036 for females. The per capita income for the CDP was $11,274. About 9.3% of families and 15.6% of the population were below the poverty line, including 12.7% of those under age 18 and none of those age 65 or over.
