= St. Joseph's Hospital (Lewistown, Montana) =

- U.S. National Register of Historic Places
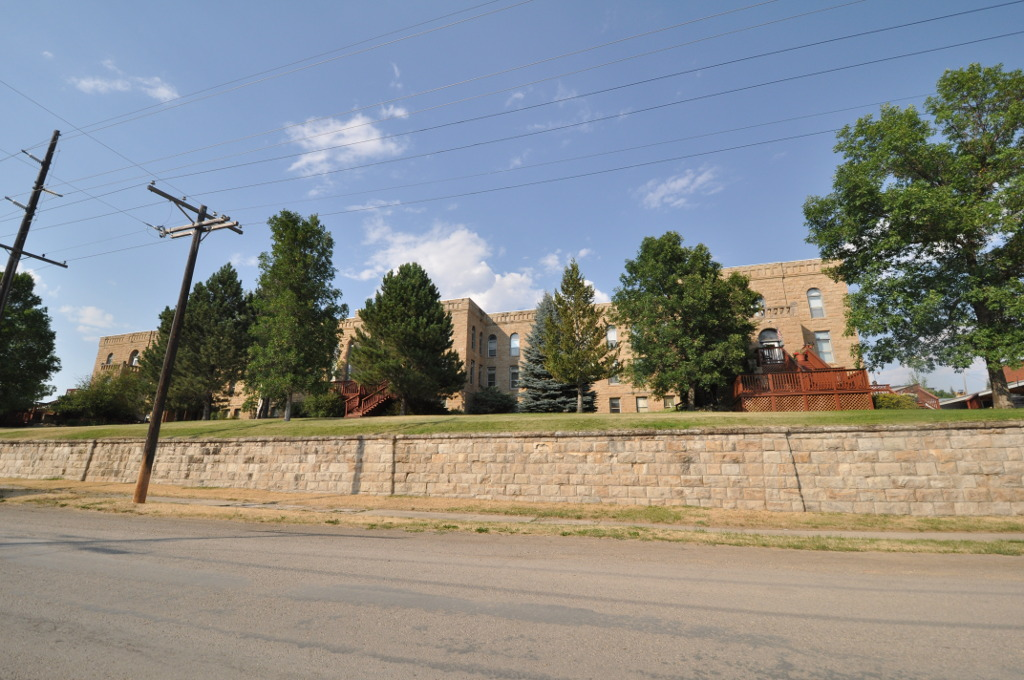

- Location within Montana Location within the United States
- Location: U.S. 87; Lewistown, Montana
- Coordinates: 47°04′06″N 109°25′06″W
- Area: 7.3 acres (3.0 ha)
- Built: 1906-53
- Built by: Pete Tuss, John F. Plovanic, Lawrence and Walter McKelvey (tile), John Haugen (carpentry)
- Architect: Kirkwood Cross, Link and Haire, W. D. Devine, J. G. Link & Co.
- NRHP reference No.: 78001684
- Added to NRHP: September 13, 1978

The St. Joseph's Hospital in Lewistown, Montana, on U.S. Route 87, was started in 1906 and grew over the years through extensions and additions of service buildings through 1953. It was listed on the National Register of Historic Places in 1978. The listing included four contributing buildings on 7.3 acres (3.0 ha).

It is a complex which overlooks Lewistown from a hill. Its central section, the original portion, is a two-and-a-half-story sandstone building.

Its history involved nuns from France.
