= Forest Grove, Montana =

- Unincorporated community
- Location within Montana
- Coordinates: 46°59′29″N 109°04′49″W
- Country: United States
- State: Montana
- Counties: Fergus
- Elevation: 4,078 ft (1,243 m)
- Time zone: UTC-7 (MST)
  - Summer (DST): UTC-6 (MDT)
- ZIP code: 59441
- GNIS feature ID: 806282

Forest Grove (or Forestgrove) is an unincorporated community in Fergus County, Montana, United States. Forest Grove has a post office with the ZIP code 59441.

The town began in 1885 when sheep and cattle ranchers arrived in the area. The community sits on Forest Grove Road between the unincorporated community of Piper and the town of Grass Range. The road itself starts off at Montana Secondary Highway 238 from the west and terminates at Grass Range to the east where it becomes Grass Range's Main Street. Through the community run two creeks, Surenough Creek and the South Fork McDonald Creek. The post office sits on Surenuff Road, along with the Saint Paul's Episcopal Church and local cemetery.

To the south of the community is Beargulch Pictographs, showcasing around 2,000 pictographs and petroglyphs by Native Americans and early settlers.

== Climate ==
Lewistown 11ESE is a weather station near Forest Grove. Lewistown 11ESE has a humid continental climate (Köppen Dfb), with long, snowy winters and short, warm summers.

Climate data for Lewistown 11ESE, Montana, 1991–2020 normals, 2008-2020 extremes: 5028ft (1533m)
Month	Jan	Feb	Mar	Apr	May	Jun	Jul	Aug	Sep	Oct	Nov	Dec	Year
Record high °F (°C)	61 (16)	61 (16)	72 (22)	82 (28)	82 (28)	91 (33)	96 (36)	99 (37)	96 (36)	87 (31)	72 (22)	59 (15)	99 (37)
Mean maximum °F (°C)	52.8 (11.6)	51.9 (11.1)	59.5 (15.3)	71.8 (22.1)	75.9 (24.4)	84.2 (29.0)	90.0 (32.2)	91.8 (33.2)	87.8 (31.0)	75.5 (24.2)	64.2 (17.9)	51.8 (11.0)	93.2 (34.0)
Mean daily maximum °F (°C)	32.8 (0.4)	33.1 (0.6)	41.0 (5.0)	49.0 (9.4)	58.6 (14.8)	66.8 (19.3)	77.3 (25.2)	77.6 (25.3)	67.2 (19.6)	52.5 (11.4)	39.2 (4.0)	33.6 (0.9)	52.4 (11.3)
Daily mean °F (°C)	23.8 (−4.6)	24.1 (−4.4)	31.3 (−0.4)	39.1 (3.9)	48.3 (9.1)	56.4 (13.6)	65.5 (18.6)	65.5 (18.6)	55.8 (13.2)	43.4 (6.3)	31.5 (−0.3)	25.4 (−3.7)	42.5 (5.8)
Mean daily minimum °F (°C)	14.8 (−9.6)	15.0 (−9.4)	21.6 (−5.8)	29.3 (−1.5)	38.0 (3.3)	46.1 (7.8)	53.7 (12.1)	53.4 (11.9)	44.3 (6.8)	34.4 (1.3)	23.8 (−4.6)	17.2 (−8.2)	32.6 (0.3)
Mean minimum °F (°C)	−10.8 (−23.8)	−7.5 (−21.9)	−1.5 (−18.6)	13.8 (−10.1)	25.3 (−3.7)	34.6 (1.4)	43.3 (6.3)	41.2 (5.1)	30.3 (−0.9)	19.4 (−7.0)	1.5 (−16.9)	−9.2 (−22.9)	−20.0 (−28.9)
Record low °F (°C)	−23 (−31)	−24 (−31)	−26 (−32)	−1 (−18)	17 (−8)	26 (−3)	39 (4)	34 (1)	21 (−6)	2 (−17)	−19 (−28)	−30 (−34)	−30 (−34)
Average precipitation inches (mm)	0.76 (19)	0.88 (22)	1.19 (30)	2.07 (53)	3.78 (96)	3.55 (90)	1.87 (47)	1.75 (44)	1.68 (43)	1.54 (39)	1.03 (26)	0.85 (22)	20.95 (531)
Average snowfall inches (cm)	19.6 (50)	22.0 (56)	17.1 (43)	22.5 (57)	6.5 (17)	0.2 (0.51)	0.0 (0.0)	0.0 (0.0)	2.3 (5.8)	11.1 (28)	16.5 (42)	17.0 (43)	134.8 (342.31)
Source 1: NOAA
Source 2: XMACIS2 (temp records, monthly max/mins & 2008-2020 snowfall)
