= First Presbyterian Church (Lewistown, Montana) =

Historic church in Montana, United States

- U.S. National Register of Historic Places
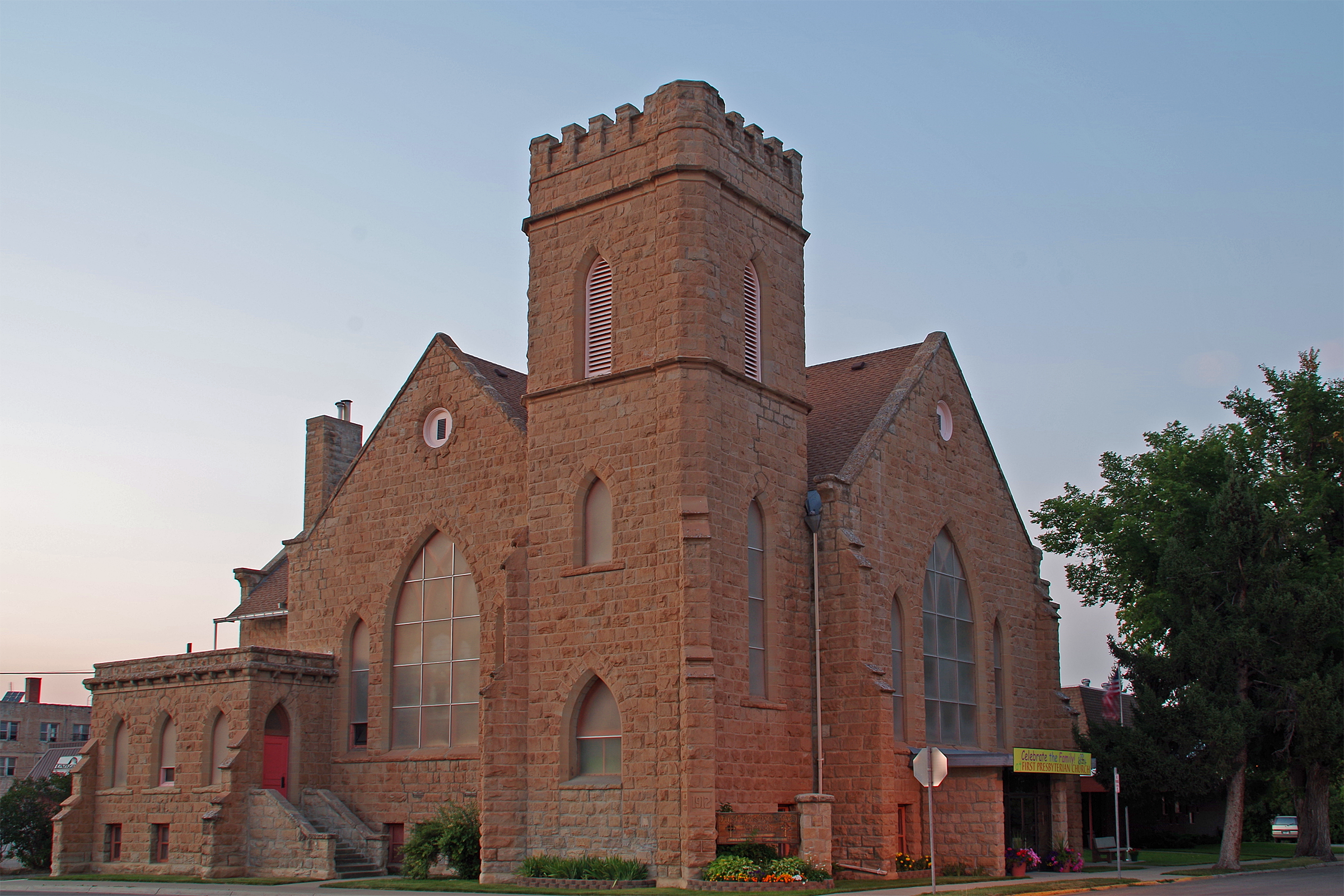
- First Presbyterian Church. September 2013.

- Location within Montana Location within the United States
- Location: 215 Fifth Ave. S, Lewistown, Montana
- Coordinates: 47°3′45″N 109°25′30″W
- Area: less than one acre
- Built: 1912
- Architect: Wasmansdorff & Eastman
- MPS: Lewistown MRA
- NRHP reference No.: 86000065
- Added to NRHP: January 10, 1986

First Presbyterian Church is a historic Presbyterian church building at 215 Fifth Avenue South in Lewistown, Montana.

It was built in 1912 and added to the National Register of Historic Places in 1986.

It was deemed "a fine example" of the "stone masonry building tradition that characterizes the early architecture of Lewistown."
