= Springhill, Montana =

- Census-designated place
- Location within Montana Location within the United States
- Coordinates: 45°52′26″N 111°04′37″W
- Country: United States
- State: Montana
- County: Gallatin

Area
  - Total: 2.78 sq mi (7.20 km^{2})
  - Land: 2.78 sq mi (7.20 km^{2})
  - Water: 0 sq mi (0.00 km^{2})
- Elevation: 4,738 ft (1,444 m)

Population (2020)
  - Total: 120
  - Density: 43.2/sq mi (16.67/km^{2})
- Time zone: UTC-7 (Mountain (MST))
  - Summer (DST): UTC-6 (MDT)
- Area code: 406
- FIPS code: 30-70375
- GNIS feature ID: 2583851

Springhill is a census-designated place (CDP) in Gallatin County, Montana, United States. As of the 2020 census, Springhill had a population of 120. It is 14 miles north of Bozeman .

== Demographics ==
Historical population
Census	Pop.	Note	%±
2020	120		—
U.S. Decennial Census

== Education ==
It is in Belgrade Elementary School District and the Belgrade High School District. The Belgrade elementary and high school districts are part of Belgrade Public Schools.

== See also ==
- List of census-designated places in Montana
