= King Ranch Colony, Montana =

- Census-designated place
- Location within Montana Location within the United States
- Coordinates: 47°03′34″N 109°37′47″W
- Country: United States
- State: Montana
- County: Fergus

Area
  - Total: 1.11 sq mi (2.87 km^{2})
  - Land: 1.11 sq mi (2.87 km^{2})
  - Water: 0 sq mi (0.00 km^{2})
- Elevation: 3,920 ft (1,190 m)

Population (2020)
  - Total: 57
  - Density: 51.4/sq mi (19.83/km^{2})
- Time zone: UTC-7 (Mountain (MST))
  - Summer (DST): UTC-6 (MDT)
- ZIP Code: 59457 (Lewistown)
- Area code: 406
- FIPS code: 30-40718
- GNIS feature ID: 2804290

King Ranch Colony is a Hutterite community and census-designated place (CDP) in Fergus County, Montana, United States. As of the 2020 census, King Ranch Colony had a population of 57. It is in the western part of the county, 3 miles (5 km) northwest of U.S. Routes 87/191 and 11 miles (18 km) west of Lewistown, the county seat.

The community was first listed as a CDP prior to the 2020 census.

== Demographics ==
Historical population
| Census | Pop. | Note | %± |
|---|---|---|---|
| 2020 | 57 | | — |
U.S. Decennial Census
