= Heath, Montana =

Unincorporated community in Montana, U.S.

Coordinates: 46°59′45″N 109°16′02″W

Heath is an unincorporated community in Fergus County, in the U.S. state of Montana.

== History ==
Heath contained a post office between the years 1910 and 1963. The community was named for Perry Heath, owner of a local ranch.
