= N-Bar Ranch =

- U.S. National Register of Historic Places
- Location within Montana Location within the United States
- Location: About 15 miles (24 km) southwest of Grass Range, Montana
- Coordinates: 46°51′16″N 108°56′19″W
- Area: 16 acres (6.5 ha)
- Built: c.1885
- NRHP reference No.: 91000881
- Added to NRHP: July 9, 1991

The N-Bar Ranch, near Grass Range, Montana, dates from the 1880s. It was listed on the National Register of Historic Places in 1991; the listing included 13 contributing buildings.

== Background ==
In 1885 Thomas Cruse, a wealthy Helena banker, bought the ranch. Over several years, Cruse expanded the ranch by adding adjoining properties. The oldest buildings are a cookhouse and an old barn, built c.1885, soon after Thomas Cruse purchased the ranch. In 1913, Cruse sold the ranch to Judith Farms Company, owned by the Bolter family and Al Smith of Helena and Austin Warr, Sr., of Lewistown. More ownership changes occurred in the years to follow.

In about 2012, the ranch came under ownership of and was operated by Wilks Ranches. Maintaining the rich history of the ranch, Wilks Ranches maintained a cow calf black Angus operation true to the ranch's roots. They maintained the historic structures and sought to improve the ranch by including other large ranches all under one operation to preserve the land, wildlife, and rich history of the ranch.

== Bibliography ==
- Grosskopf, Linda A. (1991). On Flatwillow Creek: The Story of Montana's N Bar Ranch. Exceptional Books Ltd. ISBN 978-0-944-482209.
