= Christine Donisthorpe =

American politician

Member of the New Mexico Senate for the 2nd district
- In office 1979–1996

Personal details
- Born: May 31, 1932 Christina, Montana, United States
- Died: July 23, 2017 (aged 85) Bloomfield, New Mexico
- Party: Republican
- Spouse: Oscar Lloyd Donisthorpe (m. circa 1951, w. 2010)
- Profession: farmer, real estate

Christine Ann Donisthorpe (née Benes; May 31, 1932 - July 23, 2017) was an American politician who was a Republican member of the New Mexico State Senate from 1979 to 1996. She attended the University of Montana and San Juan College and worked in real estate. She was also the chairwoman of the Bloomfield School Board from 1975 to 1981. Along with her husband, Oscar, she was also an alfalfa hay farmer near Bloomfield, New Mexico.
