= Anderson House (Lewistown, Montana) =

Historic house in Montana, United States

- U.S. National Register of Historic Places
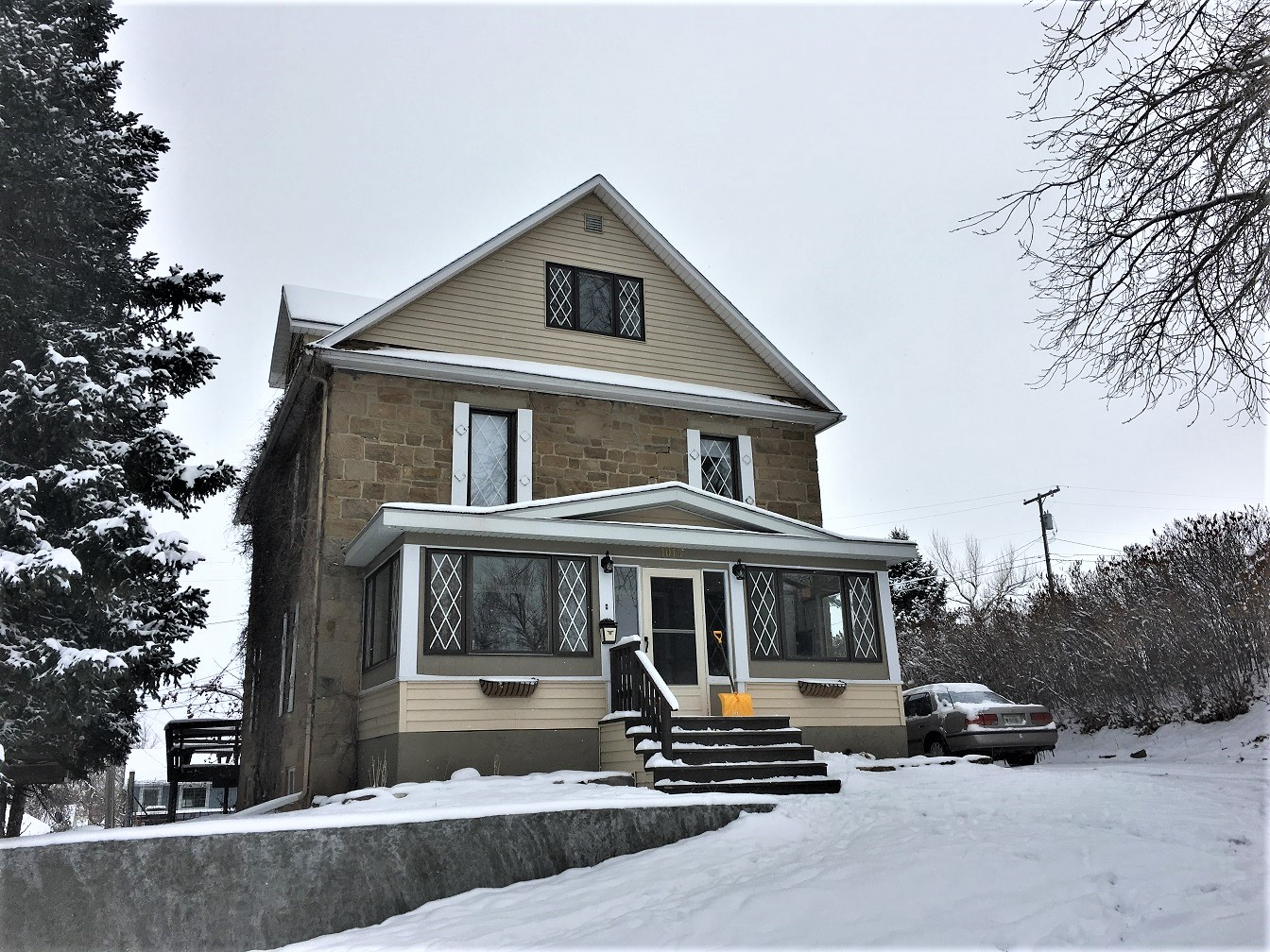

- Location within Montana Location within the United States
- Location: 1015 W. Watson; Lewistown, Montana
- Coordinates: 47°3′32″N 109°25′54″W
- Area: less than one acre
- Built: 1914
- Built by: Harry F. Anderson
- MPS: Stone Buildings in Lewistown MPS
- NRHP reference No.: 92001770
- Added to NRHP: January 27, 1993

The Anderson House in Lewistown, Montana is a two-story cut stone house built in 1914. It was listed on the National Register of Historic Places in 1993.

The house is the last-built of 17 stone houses in Lewistown and the only one built after a cement plant was established. Its own construction costs were lowered by use of poured concrete in its foundation. The main walls of the house are cut sandstone. It has a wood frame full-width enclosed porch. Subsequent to a fire, and in the two years prior to NRHP listing, the original hipped roof of the house was replaced by a tall gable roof with projecting dormers.
