= Warm Spring Creek, Montana =

- Census-designated place
- Location within Montana Location within the United States
- Coordinates: 47°11′05″N 109°16′57″W
- Country: United States
- State: Montana
- County: Fergus

Area
  - Total: 0.42 sq mi (1.10 km^{2})
  - Land: 0.42 sq mi (1.10 km^{2})
  - Water: 0 sq mi (0.00 km^{2})
- Elevation: 4,436 ft (1,352 m)

Population (2020)
  - Total: 18
  - Density: 42.4/sq mi (16.39/km^{2})
- Time zone: UTC-7 (Mountain (MST))
  - Summer (DST): UTC-6 (MDT)
- ZIP Code: 59457 (Lewistown)
- Area code: 406
- FIPS code: 30-78143
- GNIS feature ID: 2804292

Warm Spring Creek is an unincorporated community and census-designated place (CDP) in Fergus County, Montana, United States. It is near the geographic center of the county, on the west side of the Judith Mountains, in the valley of Warm Spring Creek, a west-flowing tributary of the Judith River. The community sits along Maiden Road, 16 miles (26 km) northeast of Lewistown, the county seat.

The community was first listed as a CDP prior to the 2020 census. As of the 2020 census, Warm Spring Creek had a population of 18.

== Demographics ==
Historical population
Census	Pop.	Note	%±
2020	18		—
U.S. Decennial Census
