= Christina, Montana =

- Unincorporated community
- Location within Montana Location within the United States
- Coordinates: 47°22′55″N 109°19′27″W
- Country: United States
- State: Montana
- County: Fergus
- Elevation: 3,576 ft (1,090 m)
- Time zone: UTC-7 (Mountain (MST))
  - Summer (DST): UTC-6 (MDT)
- GNIS feature ID: 806923

Christina, Montana is an unincorporated community in Fergus County, Montana, United States.

== History ==
A post office was first established as Saltbrook in 1884. The post office was renamed Christina in 1885, it closed temporarily in 1896, reopened in 1899, closed again in 1907, was reestablished in 1914, and closed permanently in 1988. The community was named in honor of Christina Hilger, wife of David Hilger.

== Notable person ==
- Christine Donisthorpe, New Mexico legislator, was born in Christina.
