= Blackfoot, Montana =

- Census-Designated Place
- Interactive map of Blackfoot, Montana
- Coordinates: 48°34′38″N 112°52′30″W
- Country: United States
- State: Montana
- County: Glacier

Area
  - Total: 0.34 sq mi (0.88 km^{2})
  - Land: 0.34 sq mi (0.88 km^{2})
  - Water: 0 sq mi (0.00 km^{2})
- Elevation: 4,154 ft (1,266 m)

Population (2020)
  - Total: 109
  - Density: 322/sq mi (124.3/km^{2})
- FIPS code: 30-07300
- GNIS feature ID: 2806620

Blackfoot is a census-designated place along the Flatiron and Willow creeks on the Blackfeet Nation in Glacier County, Montana, United States, about 26 miles (42 km) west of Cut Bank. As of the 2020 census, Blackfoot had a population of 109.

U.S. Route 2 passes by the southeast edge of the community.

== Demographics ==
Historical population
Census	Pop.	Note	%±
2020	109		—
U.S. Decennial Census

== See also ==
- List of census-designated places in Montana
