= Lewistown Courthouse Historic District =

Historic district in Montana, United States

- U.S. National Register of Historic Places
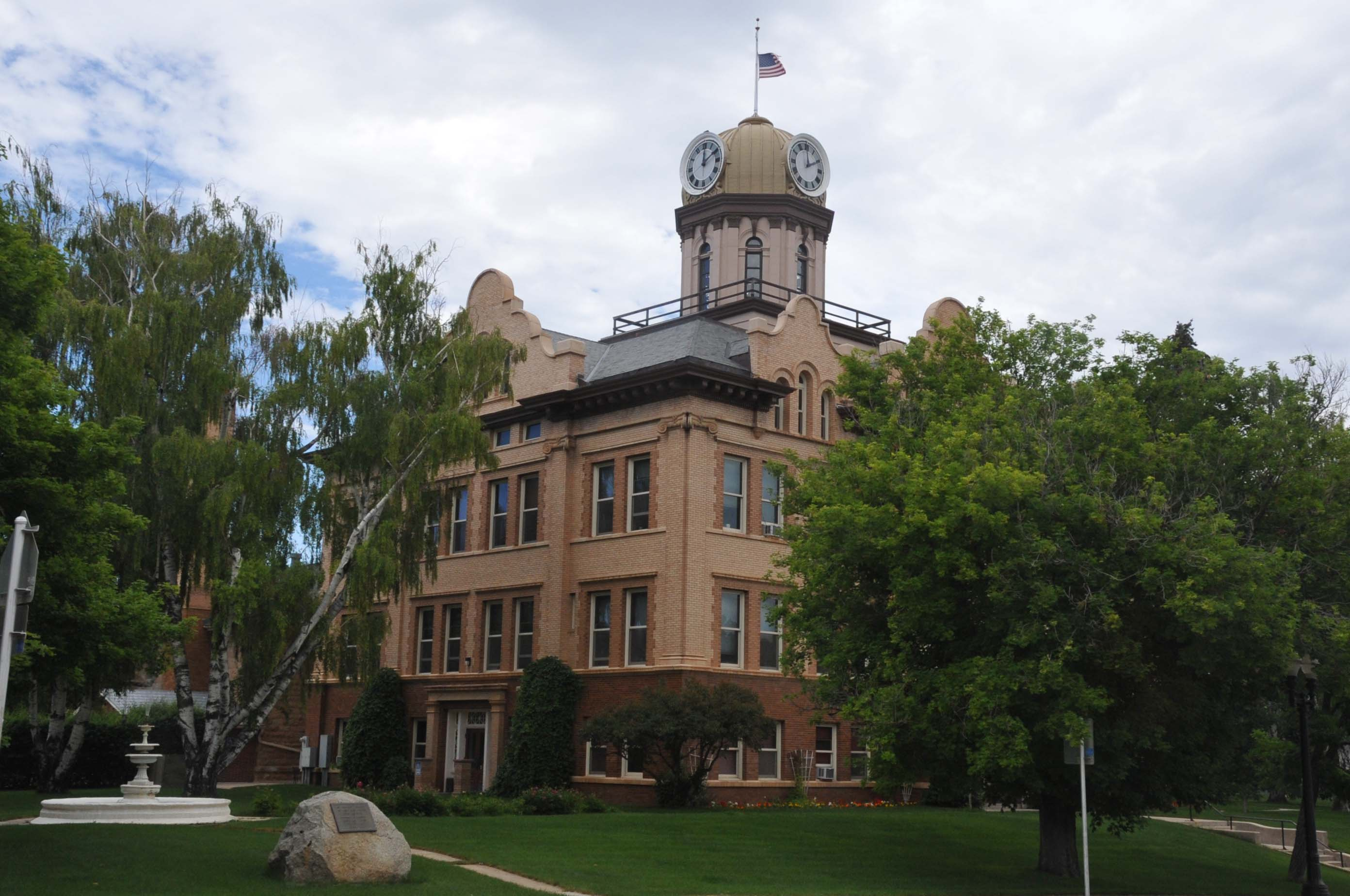

- Location within Montana Location within the United States
- Location: Roughly bounded by Washington St., 6th Ave., Main and Broadway Sts., Lewistown, Montana
- Coordinates: 47°03′42″N 109°25′50″W
- Area: 16 acres (6.5 ha)
- Built by: Multiple
- Architect: Multiple
- Architectural style: Late 19th And 20th Century Revivals, Late Victorian, American Four Square
- MPS: Lewistown MRA
- NRHP reference No.: 85001406
- Added to NRHP: June 27, 1985

The Lewistown Courthouse Historic District is a 16 acres (6.5 ha) historic district in Lewistown, Montana which was listed on the National Register of Historic Places in 1985. The listing included 22 contributing buildings.

Its area is roughly bounded by Washington Street, 6th Avenue, Main and Broadway Streets.

It includes the Fergus County Courthouse (1907), houses, the city hall, and the Lewiston Carnegie Library, which is separately NRHP-listed.

Croatian craftsman did much of the construction.
