= Brooks, Montana =

- Census-designated place
- Location within Montana Location within the United States
- Coordinates: 47°12′19″N 109°25′16″W
- Country: United States
- State: Montana
- County: Fergus

Area
  - Total: 0.089 sq mi (0.23 km^{2})
  - Land: 0.089 sq mi (0.23 km^{2})
  - Water: 0 sq mi (0.00 km^{2})
- Elevation: 3,960 ft (1,210 m)

Population (2020)
  - Total: 18
  - Density: 207/sq mi (79.8/km^{2})
- Time zone: UTC-7 (Mountain (MST))
  - Summer (DST): UTC-6 (MDT)
- ZIP Code: 59457 (Lewistown)
- Area code: 406
- FIPS code: 30-10150
- GNIS feature ID: 2804284

Brooks is an unincorporated community and census-designated place (CDP) in Fergus County, Montana, United States. It is in the west-central part of the county, on the south side of Montana Highway 81, 11 miles (18 km) north of Lewistown and 27 miles (43 km) southeast of Denton.

As of the 2020 census, Brooks had a population of 18.

The community was first listed as a CDP prior to the 2020 census.

== Demographics ==
Historical population
Census	Pop.	Note	%±
2020	18		—
U.S. Decennial Census
