= Hilger, Montana =

- Census-Designated Place
- Interactive map of Hilger, Montana
- Coordinates: 47°15′21″N 109°21′26″W
- Country: United States
- State: Montana
- County: Fergus

Area
  - Total: 0.28 sq mi (0.73 km^{2})
  - Land: 0.28 sq mi (0.73 km^{2})
  - Water: 0 sq mi (0.00 km^{2})
- Elevation: 4,078 ft (1,243 m)

Population (2020)
  - Total: 24
  - Density: 85.6/sq mi (33.04/km^{2})
- FIPS code: 30-36325
- GNIS feature ID: 2804289

Hilger is an unincorporated community and census-designated place in Fergus County, Montana, United States. As of the 2020 census, Hilger had a population of 24. The community is located along U.S. Highway 191 in central Fergus County. Hilger has a post office with the ZIP code 59451. It is 15 miles north of Lewistown.

== History ==
A post office has been in operation in Hilger since 1911. The community was named for settler and historian David J. Hilger.

In 1911 the Chicago, Milwaukee, St. Paul and Pacific Railroad, known as the Milwaukee Road, was built in Hilger.

== Demographics ==
Historical population
Census	Pop.	Note	%±
2020	24		—
U.S. Decennial Census
