= Lewistown Silk Stocking District =

Historic district in Montana, United States

- U.S. National Register of Historic Places
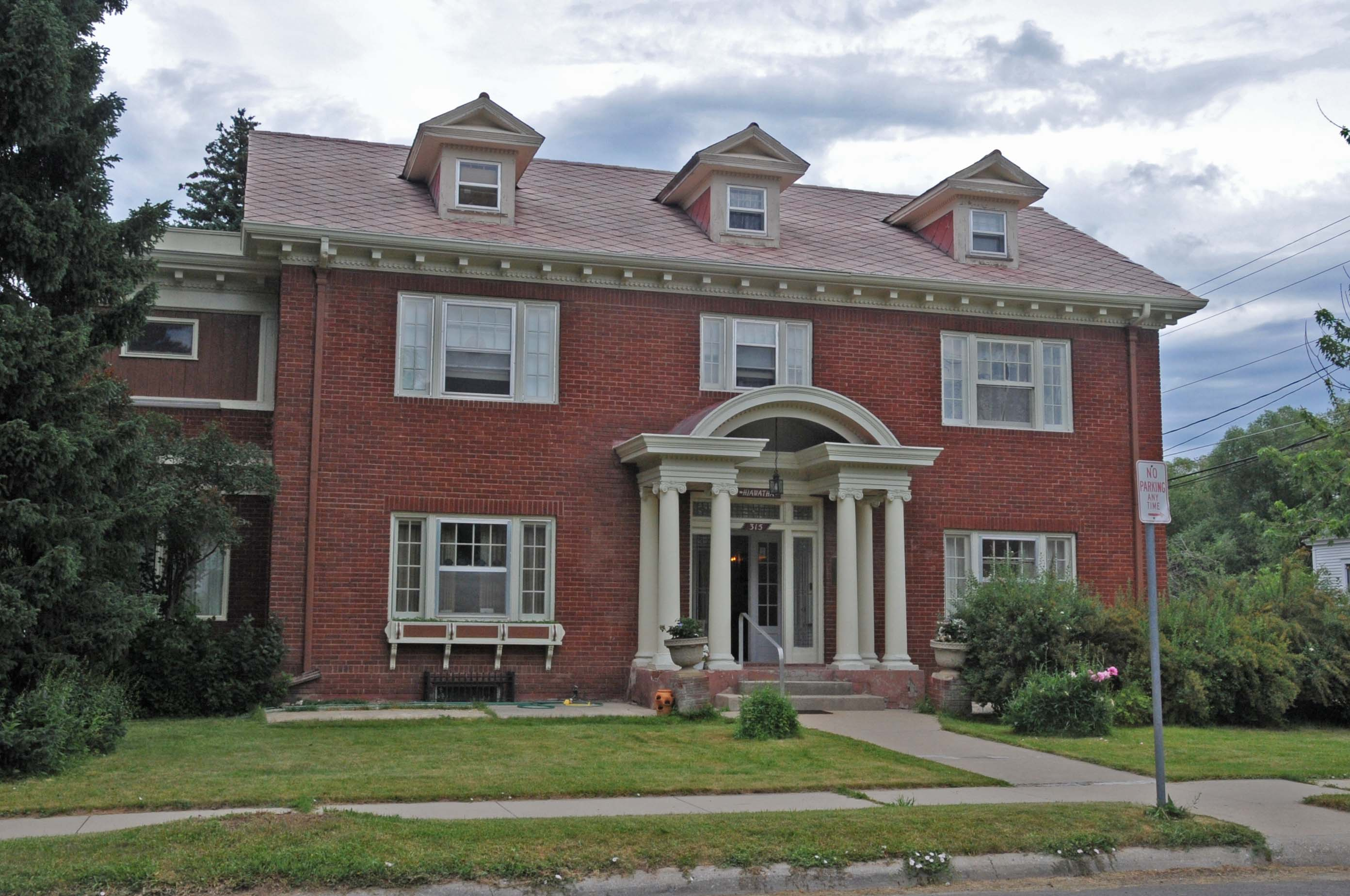

- Location within Montana Location within the United States
- Location: Roughly bounded by 2nd Ave., Boulevard and Washington Sts. and 3rd Ave., Lewistown, Montana
- Coordinates: 47°03′58″N 109°25′36″W
- Area: 4 acres (1.6 ha)
- Architect: Multiple
- Architectural style: Late Victorian, Georgian, Federal
- MPS: Lewistown MRA
- NRHP reference No.: 85001407
- Added to NRHP: June 27, 1985

The Lewistown Silk Stocking District is a historic district in Lewistown, Montana which was listed on the National Register of Historic Places in 1985.

About 4 acres (1.6 ha) in area, the district is roughly bounded by 2nd Ave., Boulevard and Washington Sts. and 3rd Ave. It included seven contributing buildings.

Architecture: Late Victorian, Georgian, Federal

It includes seven historic houses:

- Swietzer Residence (1919), 315 N. 3rd St.
- Symmes Residence (1909), also known as Babin Residence, 220 W. Boulevard
- Taylor Residence (1920), also known as St. Leo's Rectory
- Waite Residence (1909)
- Fred R. Warren Residence (1915), Fallen Residence, 210 W. Boulevard
- Wiedeman Residence (1904), designed by architect C.E. Bell
- J.T. Wunderlin Residence (1905)
