= Deerfield Colony, Montana =

- Census-designated place
- Location within Montana Location within the United States
- Coordinates: 47°15′36″N 109°40′43″W
- Country: United States
- State: Montana
- County: Fergus

Area
  - Total: 0.57 sq mi (1.48 km^{2})
  - Land: 0.57 sq mi (1.47 km^{2})
  - Water: 0.0077 sq mi (0.02 km^{2})
- Elevation: 3,458 ft (1,054 m)

Population (2020)
  - Total: 48
  - Density: 84.7/sq mi (32.69/km^{2})
- Time zone: UTC-7 (Mountain (MST))
  - Summer (DST): UTC-6 (MDT)
- ZIP Code: 59457 (Lewistown)
- Area code: 406
- FIPS code: 30-19800
- GNIS feature ID: 2804287

Deerfield Colony is a Hutterite community and census-designated place (CDP) in Fergus County, Montana, United States. It is in the western part of the county, on the south side of Montana Highway 81, 25 miles (40 km) northwest of Lewistown and 14 miles (23 km) southeast of Denton.

The community was first listed as a CDP prior to the 2020 census.

As of the 2020 census, Deerfield Colony had a population of 48.

== Demographics ==
Historical population
Census	Pop.	Note	%±
2020	48		—
U.S. Decennial Census
