= Garneill, Montana =

- Unincorporated community
- Location within Montana Location within the United States
- Coordinates: 46°45′02″N 109°45′05″W
- Country: United States
- State: Montana
- County: Fergus
- Elevation: 4,420 ft (1,350 m)
- Time zone: UTC-7 (Mountain (MST))
  - Summer (DST): UTC-6 (MDT)
- GNIS feature ID: 802105

Garneill is an unincorporated community in Fergus County, Montana, United States. It is located on U.S. Route 191, 5 miles (8.0 km) north of Judith Gap.

== History ==
A post office was established at Garneill in 1899, and remained in operation until it was discontinued in 1975. Garneill is a conjoin of the names of two early settlers: Garnet and Neill.
