= Hoosac, Montana =

Unincorporated community in Montana, U.S.

Coordinates: 47°16′33″N 109°50′25″W

Hoosac is an unincorporated community in Fergus County, in the U.S. state of Montana.

== History ==
Hoosac contained a post office from 1914 until 1919. The community took its name after the nearby Hoosac Tunnel.
