= Ayers House (Lewistown, Montana) =

Historic house in Montana, United States

- U.S. National Register of Historic Places
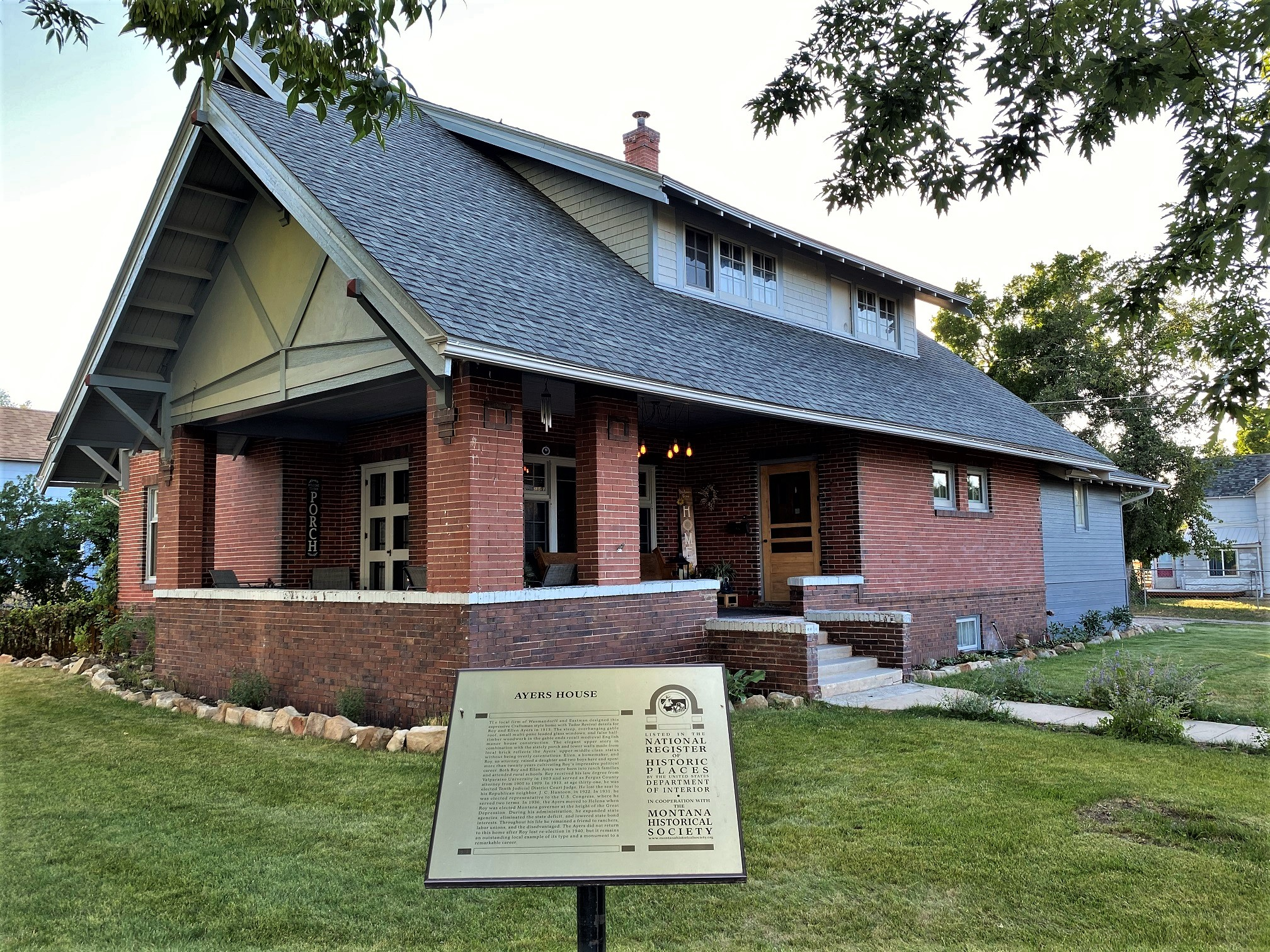

- Location within Montana Location within the United States
- Location: 316 Eighth Ave. S. Lewistown, Montana
- Coordinates: 47°04′06″N 109°25′39″W
- Area: less than one acre
- Built: 1913
- Built by: Folis & Coulter
- Architect: Wasmansdorff & Eastman
- Architectural style: Mixed (more Than 2 Styles From Different Periods)
- MPS: Lewistown MRA
- NRHP reference No.: 86000061
- Added to NRHP: January 10, 1986

The Ayers House, in Lewistown, Montana, is a historic house built in 1913. Also known as the Ricker Residence, it was listed on the National Register of Historic Places in 1986.

Wasmansdorff & Eastman designed it; Folis & Coulter built it.

It is a one-and-a-half-story brick building.
