= Buffalo, Montana =

Unincorporated hamlet in Montana, U.S.

Coordinates: 46°49′16″N 109°49′43″W

Buffalo is an unincorporated community in Fergus County, Montana, United States. Buffalo has a post office with the ZIP code 59418. It was named for the buffalo which roamed this area.

The post office was established in 1890. It closed for several years until the Great Northern Railroad created a line to Billings with Buffalo as a station.

Buffalo is bordered by Lewis and Clark National Forest. It is located between the Little Belt Mountains and the Big Snowy Mountains.

== Climate ==
The Köppen Climate System classifies the weather as humid continental, abbreviated as Dfb.

Climate data for Buffalo, Montana
Month	Jan	Feb	Mar	Apr	May	Jun	Jul	Aug	Sep	Oct	Nov	Dec	Year
Mean daily maximum °C (°F)	−3 (26)	2 (35)	2 (36)	10 (50)	17 (62)	21 (69)	27 (81)	26 (79)	20 (68)	14 (57)	7 (44)	2 (36)	12 (54)
Mean daily minimum °C (°F)	−16 (4)	−10 (14)	−9 (15)	−3 (26)	3 (37)	6 (43)	10 (50)	9 (49)	4 (40)	0 (32)	−6 (22)	−9 (15)	−2 (29)
Average precipitation mm (inches)	28 (1.1)	20 (0.8)	36 (1.4)	53 (2.1)	94 (3.7)	100 (4)	58 (2.3)	56 (2.2)	53 (2.1)	41 (1.6)	28 (1.1)	28 (1.1)	600 (23.6)
Source: Weatherbase
