= Big Spring Creek (Montana) =

Big Spring Creek Big Spring Branch Big Spring Fork of the Judith River East Fork Big Spring Creek
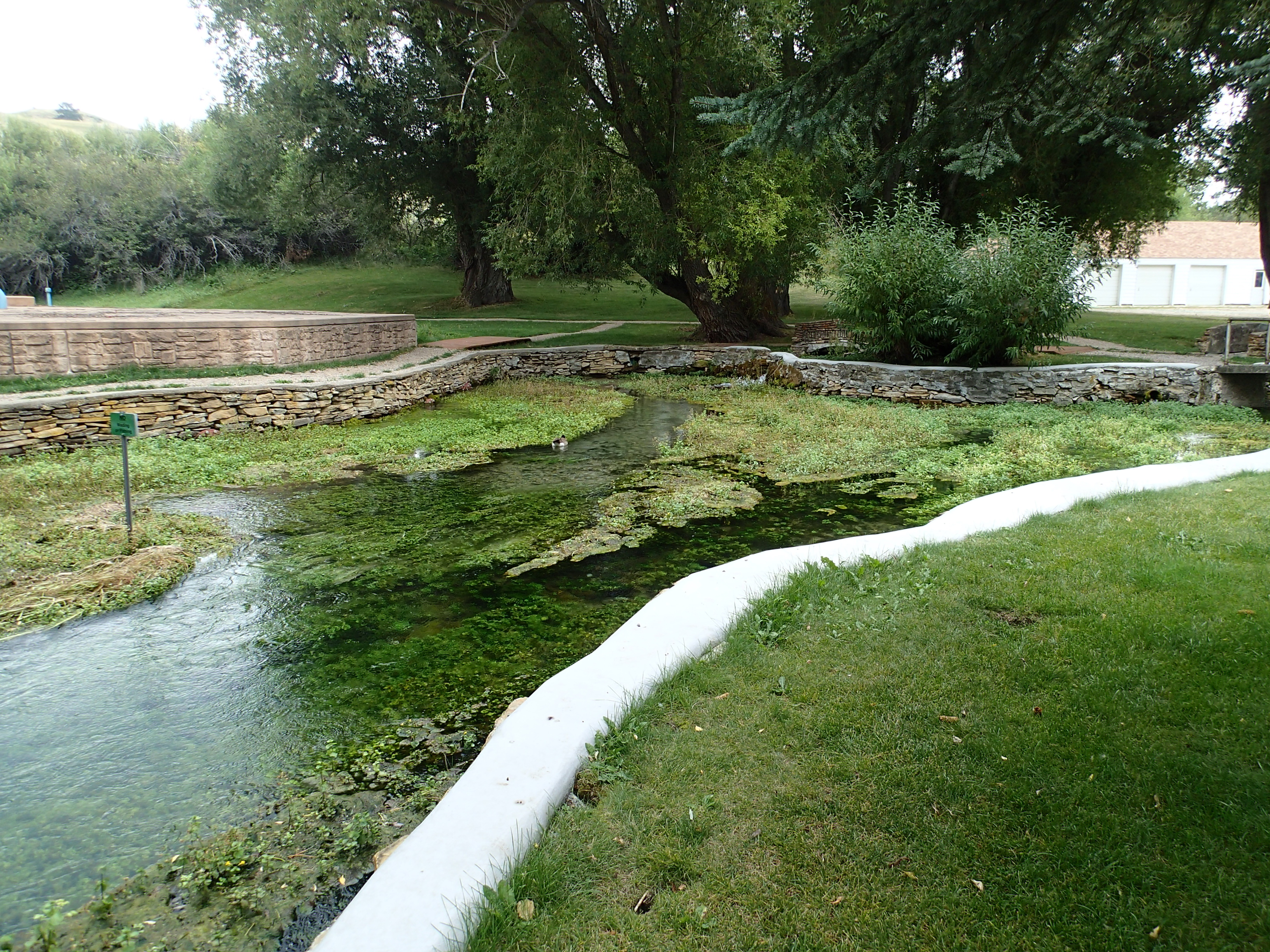
- Source of Big Spring Creek

- Location of mouth

Location
- Country: United States
- State: Montana
- District: Fergus County, Montana

Physical characteristics
- Mouth
  - location: Judith River
  - coordinates: 47°12′11″N 109°38′29″W
  - elevation: 3,379 ft (1,030 m)
- Length: 30 mi (48 km)
- Discharge
  - location: near Lewistown
  - average: 183 cu ft/s (5.2 m^{3}/s)

Big Spring Creek (Gros Ventre: ʔinííθɔ́ɔwuh, lit. 'warm water') is a tributary of the Judith River in Fergus County, Montana near Lewistown, Montana. The creek originates from a first magnitude artesian spring approximately 6 miles (9.7 km) south of Lewistown and flows north, northwest for 30 miles (48 km) to its confluence with the Judith River. The spring is one of the largest in the world flowing at approximately 50,000 to 64,000 US gallons (190,000 to 240,000 L) per minute out of the Madison-Limestone formation in the foothills of the Big Snowy Mountains. The creek flows through and under the town of Lewistown. For three blocks spanning Main Street, the creek runs underneath the town in a man-made channel that was created as the town was built over the creek. The spring provides Lewistown's water supply, which requires no treatment for use by consumers.

== History ==
During the 1877 Nez Perce War, Chief Joseph's band of Nez Perce camped along Big Spring Creek on the night of September 21, 1877 while trying to escape U.S. Army forces pursuing them. The campsite was near the stockade of the Reed and Bowles trading post which they had visited many times during summer hunting expeditions in the Judith Basin. They visited with Reed telling him about the encounters with the soldiers during their flight from Oregon.

In 1879, what became known as the Spring Creek Band of Métis migrated into the Judith Basin from the Milk River region north of the Missouri River to hunt buffalo in the area. The extended families of Pierre Berger (1879) and Francis Janeaux (1880) established a settlement on Big Spring Creek where the Carroll Trail (a freight road from a steamboat landing on the Missouri River to Helena, Montana) crossed the creek. The site became the town of Lewistown, Montana which was formally established in 1883.

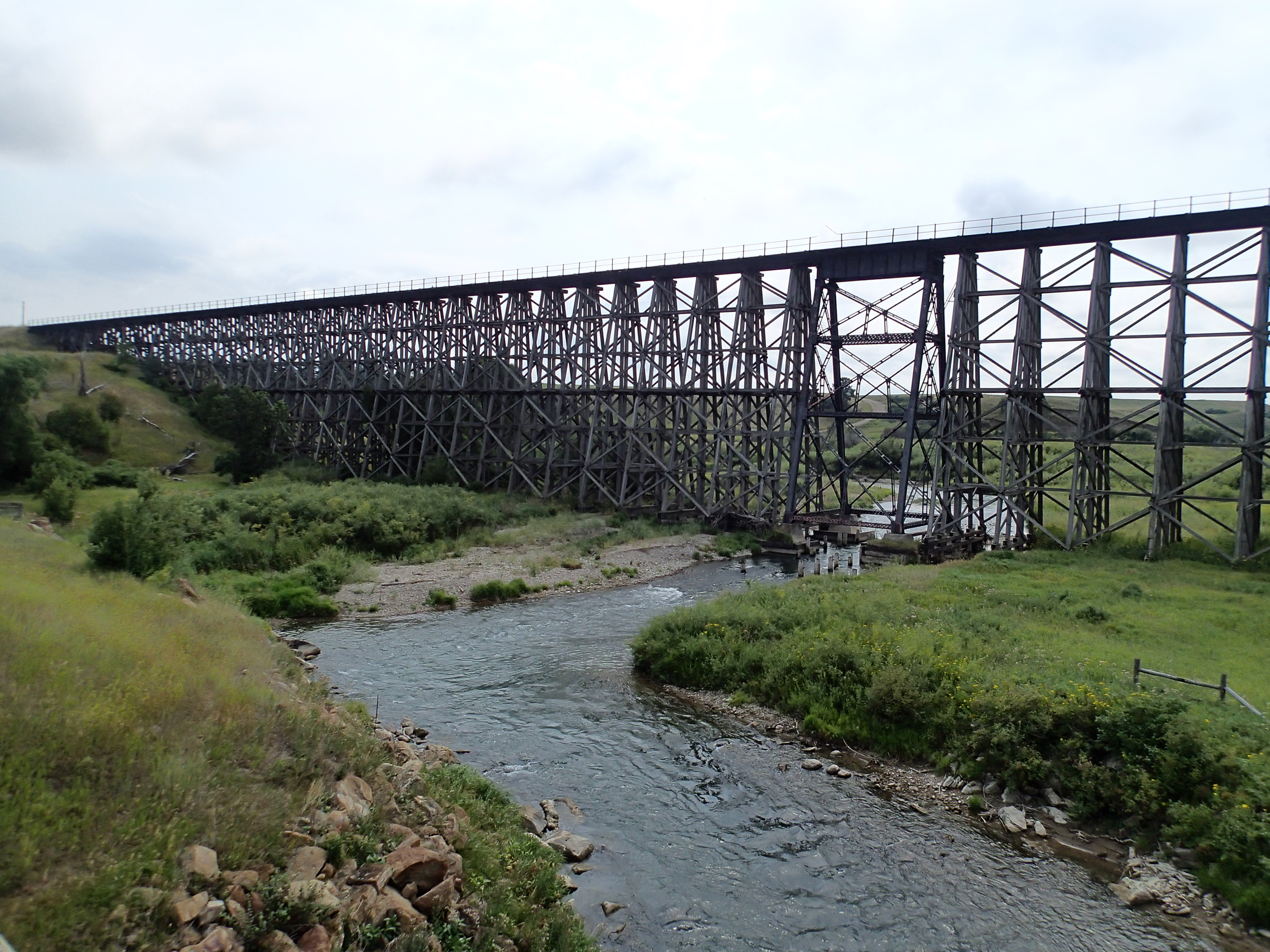
Great Northern and Milwaukee Road Spring Creek trestle at mile 12

As the town of Lewistown grew, the creek, especially sections south of town began to degrade through water diversions for irrigation and power as well as some channelization to straighten sections to reclaim land and mitigate the effects of annual spring flooding. Progressive-minded settlers modified the meandering creek in favor of transportation and agriculture efficiency. Irrigation ditches were dug as early as 1884. By 1886 water was being diverted to power a flour mill. Around 1910, a section the creek was straightened to create a switching yard for the Milwaukee Road, an area that eventually became known as Brewery Flats. By 1922 Lewistown authorities had tunneled the creek through an 840-foot long concrete conduit beneath the central business district.

In 1922 the city of Lewistown in cooperation with a local rod and gun club established the Big Springs Trout Hatchery at the artesian spring source of the creek. During the 1930s the Works Progress Administration (WPA) augmented the site with rock walled ponds and bridges for the hatchery and spring area, and planted willow trees around the spring area. Some of this work is still part of the hatchery. The hatchery eventually came under the purview of the state and is now operated by the Montana Department of Fish, Wildlife and Parks. Additions have been made to the hatchery through the years including buildings with inside raceways, outside raceways, houses and garages and in 1959 an additional site was added downstream. The Big Springs Trout Hatchery is the largest coldwater salmonid production facility in the state capable of producing 130,000 pounds of fish annually. Trout species propagated include several strains of rainbow trout, as well as Yellowstone cutthroat and brown trout, and Kokanee salmon.

The hatchery had contributed to a serious pollution situation when in 2003, high levels of PCBs were found in the creek downstream from the hatchery. The source of the PCBs was found to be from the paint used on the hatchery raceways which entered the creek when paint flaked off in the raceways. The hatchery ceased production for several years while the source of the PCBs was eliminated.

Between the early 1900s into the 1980s the Brewery Flats section of the creek south of Lewistown was the site of various industrial activities including a rail yard, coal mine, oil refinery, feedlot and a brewery. The meanders of Big Spring Creek in the section were straightened and channelized into a ditch that diverted the creek away from the developments. In 1985 the Montana Department of Fish, Wildlife & Parks acquired 23 acres (9.3 ha) of the Brewery Flats section to establish a fishing access site. Although nature had begun to reclaim the developed land with cattail marshes, cottonwood groves, and willow thickets, natural reclamation was impeded by the creek's channelization which eliminated annual flooding and siltation that fosters stream health.

After a slow start in planning and securing funding, the Montana Department of Fish, Wildlife & Parks initiative the reclamation effort in 1998. A coalition of local citizens, educators, civic groups, and government agencies—the Brewery Flats Planning and Development Committee—built community support for the $365,000 restoration project. The restoration design called for re-establishing stream meanders that mimicked the historic course of Big Spring Creek. The new channel would meander 4,000 feet (1,200 m) across Brewery Flats replacing the straight 2,600 feet (790 m) channel where the creek had been flowing for at least 80 years. In September 2000, water was diverted from the old channel into the new meandering course. Today, the Brewery Flats section of Big Spring Creek is much as it was in the 19th century.

== Angling ==
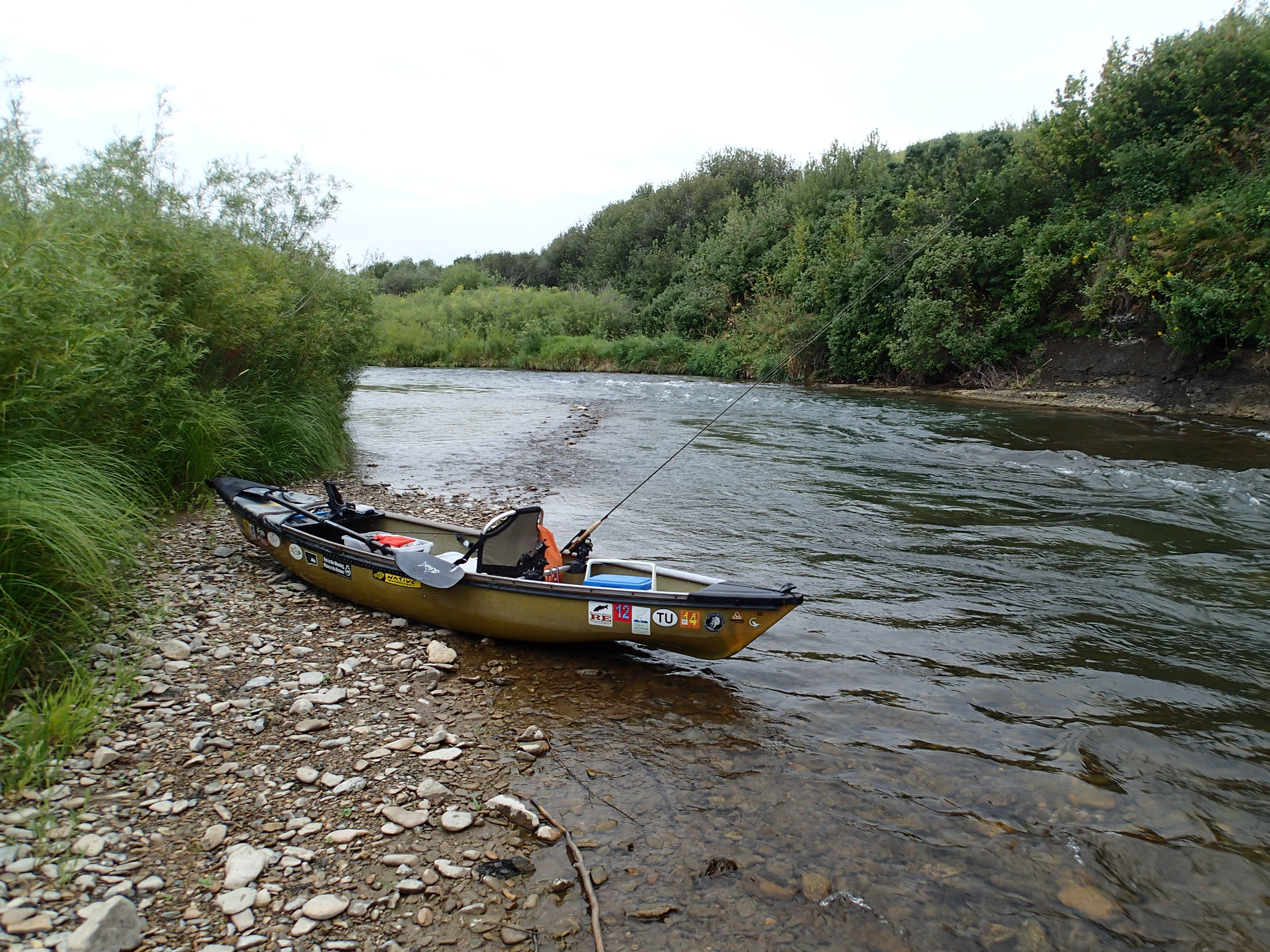
Mile 15 of Big Spring Creek

Big Spring Creek is a popular angling location for trout anglers with significant public access along its 30 mi (48 km) length. There are six public Fishing Access Sites operated by the Montana Department of Fish, Wildlife and Parks between river mile 27 and mile 15. Fly fishing is popular for rainbow and brown trout as well as brook trout in some sections with fish population estimates up to 1500 catch-able fish per mile. The creek was once populated with Westslope cutthroat trout which were eventually extirpated with the introduction rainbow and brown trout in the 1920s. Big Spring Creek anglers have landed brown trout up to 19 pounds (8.6 kg) and rainbow trout to 16 pounds (7.3 kg). The Big Spring Creek record brown trout was 33 inches (84 cm) long and 21 inches (53 cm) in girth. Browns and rainbows in the creek typically range from 12 to 18 inches (30 to 46 cm) long.

== Other creeks ==
- Big Spring Creek, Granite County, Montana, el. 6,342 feet (1,933 m), 46°05′37″N 113°26′40″W
- Big Spring Creek, Granite County, Montana, el. 4,485 feet (1,367 m),46°24′47″N 113°42′42″W
- Big Spring Creek, Gallatin County, Montana, el. 6,785 feet (2,068 m), 45°02′47″N 111°11′51″W
