= Danvers, Montana =

- Census-Designated Place
- Interactive map of Danvers, Montana
- Coordinates: 47°13′42″N 109°42′47″W
- Country: United States
- State: Montana
- County: Fergus

Area
  - Total: 0.27 sq mi (0.70 km^{2})
  - Land: 0.27 sq mi (0.70 km^{2})
  - Water: 0 sq mi (0.00 km^{2})
- Elevation: 3,547 ft (1,081 m)

Population (2020)
  - Total: 16
  - Density: 59.3/sq mi (22.89/km^{2})
- FIPS code: 30-19225
- GNIS feature ID: 2804286

Danvers is an unincorporated community in Fergus County, in the U.S. state of Montana. As of the 2020 census, Danvers had a population of 16.

Nearby St. Wenceslaus Catholic Church is on the National Register of Historic Places.

== History ==
A post office was established at Danvers in 1914, and remained in operation until it was discontinued in 1982. The community took its name after Danvers, Massachusetts.

== Demographics ==
Historical population
Census	Pop.	Note	%±
2020	16		—
U.S. Decennial Census
