= Landusky, Montana =

- Census-designated place
- Location within Montana Location within the United States
- Coordinates: 47°53′51″N 108°37′20″W
- Country: United States
- State: Montana
- County: Phillips

Area
  - Total: 0.089 sq mi (0.23 km^{2})
  - Land: 0.089 sq mi (0.23 km^{2})
  - Water: 0 sq mi (0.00 km^{2})
- Elevation: 4,026 ft (1,227 m)

Population (2020)
  - Total: 22
  - Density: 252.6/sq mi (97.54/km^{2})
- Time zone: UTC-7 (Mountain (MST))
  - Summer (DST): UTC-6 (MDT)
- ZIP Code: 59546 (Zortman)
- Area code: 406
- FIPS code: 30-42325
- GNIS feature ID: 2804314

Landusky is an unincorporated community and census-designated place (CDP) in Phillips County, Montana, United States, with a population of 22 per the 2020 census. It is in the southwestern part of the county, in the southwestern part of the Little Rocky Mountains. It sits in the valley of Rock Creek, between Mill Gulch to the northeast and Montana Gulch to the northwest. Ore Street dead-ends in Landusky and leads southwest out of the Little Rockies 3.5 miles (5.6 km) to Montana Highway 66. The community is served by the Zortman post office, less than 5 miles (8 km) to the northeast across the Little Rockies but 21 miles (34 km) by road.

Landusky was first listed as a CDP prior to the 2020 census.

Episode "Tall Heart, Short Temper" of the 1950s historical drama Television anthology series, Death Valley Days, tells the story of Powell "Pike" Landusky, whom the town is named after. The episode includes how he and his business partner were captured by a war party of Brule Indians. Landusky, notorious for his bad temper and quarrelsome behavior, rampaged against his captors with a frying pan. The warrior braves were struck with awe by the violent spectacle and retreated, even leaving two ponies to calm him down.

== Demographics ==
Historical population
Census	Pop.	Note	%±
2020	22		—
U.S. Decennial Census
