= Judith River =

River in the United States of America

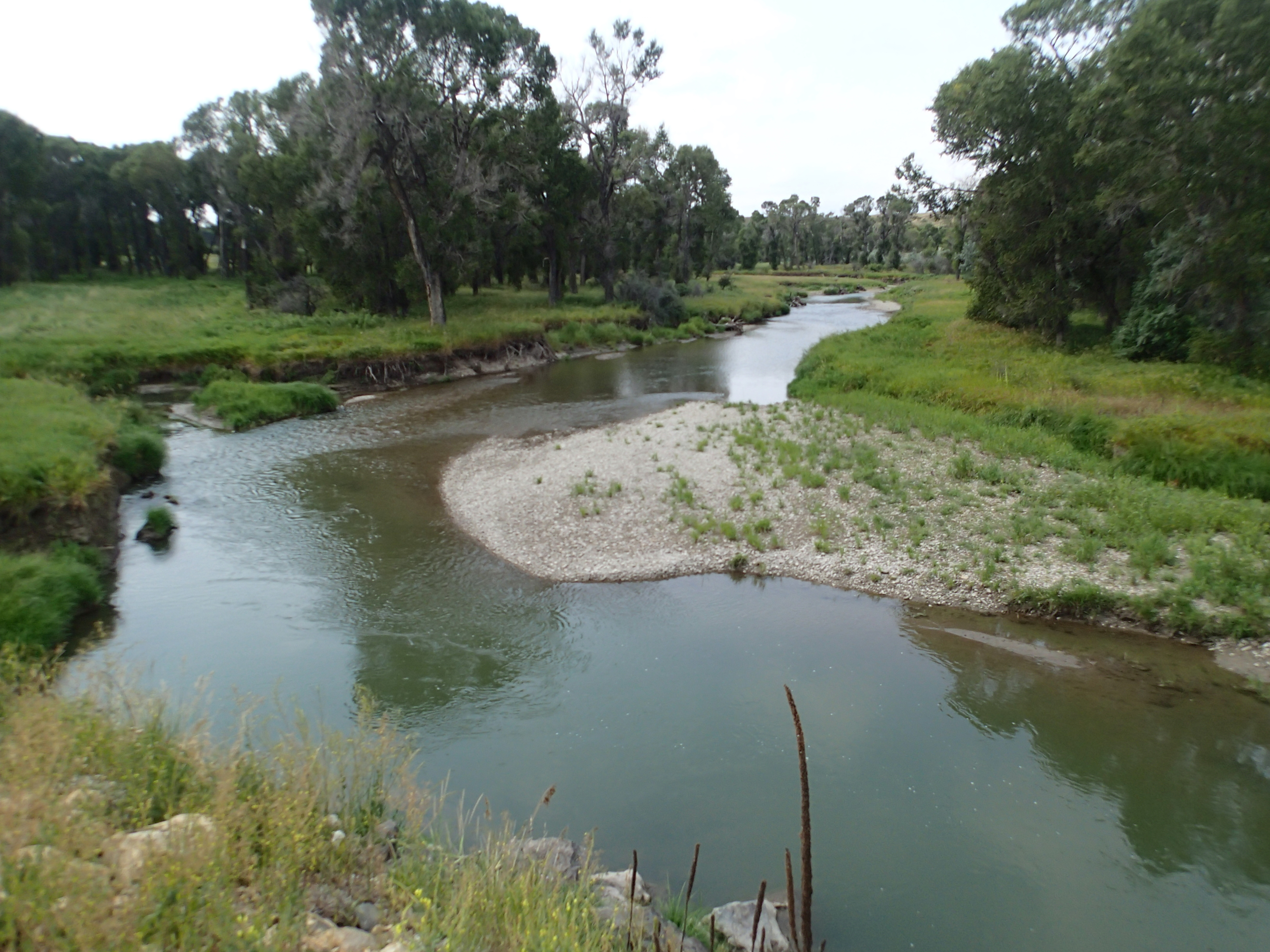
- Judith River near Hanover Road

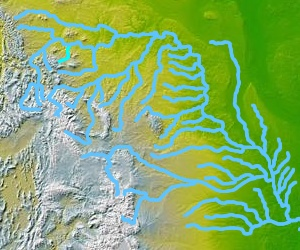
- The Judith River

Location
- Country: Fergus and Judith Basin County, Montana

Physical characteristics
- Source
  - coordinates: 46°50′32.7″N 110°30′23.3″W
- Mouth
  - coordinates: 47°44′06″N 109°38′46″W
  - elevation: 2,408 feet (734 m)
- Discharge
  - location: near mouth, (near Winifred)
  - average: 292 cu ft/s (8.3 m^{3}/s)

Basin features
- River system: Missouri River
- Tributaries
  - left: Big Spring Creek

The Judith River is a tributary of the Missouri River, approximately 124 mi (200 km) long, running through central Montana in the United States. It rises in the Little Belt Mountains and flows northeast past Utica and Hobson. It is joined by Dry Wolf Creek in northern Fergus County, and itself joins the Missouri in the White Cliffs Area approximately 18 mi (29 km) northwest of Winifred.

The river gives its name to the Judith River Group of the late Cretaceous, a notable area for excavation of dinosaur fossils that stretches from Montana into southeastern Alberta and southwestern Saskatchewan. The river was named by William Clark. William Clark came across a stream which he considered particularly clear and pretty, and named it the Judith River, in honor of his cousin Julia Hancock. It is also known for its large amount of Cretaceous dinosaur fossils, including those of Tyrannosaurus, Styracosaurus and Edmontosaurus.

The Judith is a Class I river from the confluence with Big Spring Creek to its confluence with the Missouri River for public access for recreational purposes.

== History ==
The Crow tribe called this waterway Buluhpa’ashe (“Plum River”). Capt. Meriwether Lewis named this central Montana river the Bighorn. On May 29, 1805, Capt. William Clark renamed it in honor of his future wife, Julia (Judith) Hancock. Beginning in the 1880s, the area surrounding the Judith River at Judith Landing was home to two large ranching operations: the DHS Ranch of A.J. and Erwin Davis, Samuel T. Hauser, and Granville Stuart; and the PN Ranch of Thomas C. Power and G.R. Norris.

White Eagle, "the last major Chief of the Gros Ventre people", died "at the mouth of the Judith River" on February 9, 1881.

== Crossings ==
- Unnamed Road (location 47°39'46.9"N 109°38'57.6"W)
- Judith River Rd (location 47°33'33.4"N 109°35'24.2"W)
- Montana Highway 81 (location 47°16'25.2"N 109°43'12.5"W)
- Milwaukee Road Railway Denton to Lewistown (location 47°10'16.5"N 109°39'02.3"W)
- Hanover Rd (location 47°07'28.2"N 109°40'45.5"W)
- Great_Northern_Railway_(U.S.) Moccasin To Lewiston(location 47°04'28.4"N 109°42'59.5"W)
- Tognetti Rd (location 47°03'48.3"N 109°44'05.0"W)
- Montana Road 311 (location 47°01'40.5"N 109°48'32.6"W)
- Montana Highway 3 (location 47°00'39.7"N 109°52'20.2"W)
- 5th Ave W (location 47°00'38.6"N 109°52'56.0"W)
- Great_Northern_Railway_(U.S.) Judith Gap to Stanford (location 47°00'40.2"N 109°53'03.5"W)
- Montana Route 239 (location 46°59'50.8"N 109°55'33.7"W)
- Riverside Ranch Rd (location 46°59'27.1"N 109°56'29.3"W)
- Philbrook Rd (location 46°59'06.9"N 109°58'25.6"W)
- Ackley Lake Rd (location 46°58'05.4"N 110°04'50.9"W)
- Antelope Creek Rd (location 46°57'09.8"N 110°05'34.9"W)
- Wertheimer Dr (location 46°57'01.0"N 110°06'23.8"W)
- Arnot Rd (location 46°53'02.6"N 110°14'39.8"W)
- Unnamed Road (location 46°51'33.3"N 110°15'46.1"W)

== See also ==
- List of rivers of Montana
- Montana Stream Access Law
- Upper Missouri River National Monument
