= Grass Range, Montana =

- Town
- Location of Grass Range, Montana
- Coordinates: 47°01′34″N 108°48′11″W
- Country: United States
- State: Montana
- County: Fergus

Area
  - Total: 0.14 sq mi (0.36 km^{2})
  - Land: 0.14 sq mi (0.36 km^{2})
  - Water: 0 sq mi (0.00 km^{2})
- Elevation: 3,484 ft (1,062 m)

Population (2020)
  - Total: 110
  - Density: 786.6/sq mi (303.71/km^{2})
- Time zone: UTC-7 (Mountain (MST))
  - Summer (DST): UTC-6 (MDT)
- ZIP codes: 59032, 59441
- Area code: 406
- FIPS code: 30-32575
- GNIS feature ID: 2412706

Grass Range is a town in Fergus County, Montana, United States. The population was 110 in both the 2010 census and 2020 census.

== History ==
A post office has been in operation in Grass Range since 1883. The town was probably named due to the fact that livestock graze here.

== Geography ==
Grass Range is located at 47°1′34″N 108°48′12″W (47.025980, -108.803391). U.S. Route 87 passes through town. It is 31 miles from Lewistown.

According to the United States Census Bureau, the town has a total area of 0.15 square miles (0.39 km^{2}), all land.

=== Climate ===
Climate data for Grass Range, Montana (1991–2020)
Month	Jan	Feb	Mar	Apr	May	Jun	Jul	Aug	Sep	Oct	Nov	Dec	Year
Mean daily maximum °F (°C)	37.2 (2.9)	38.8 (3.8)	48.2 (9.0)	57.1 (13.9)	66.0 (18.9)	74.0 (23.3)	83.3 (28.5)	82.7 (28.2)	72.6 (22.6)	58.9 (14.9)	46.3 (7.9)	37.7 (3.2)	58.6 (14.8)
Daily mean °F (°C)	25.7 (−3.5)	27.2 (−2.7)	35.6 (2.0)	43.9 (6.6)	52.8 (11.6)	60.7 (15.9)	68.1 (20.1)	67.3 (19.6)	58.0 (14.4)	46.1 (7.8)	34.5 (1.4)	26.4 (−3.1)	45.5 (7.5)
Mean daily minimum °F (°C)	14.2 (−9.9)	15.7 (−9.1)	23.0 (−5.0)	30.7 (−0.7)	39.5 (4.2)	47.4 (8.6)	52.9 (11.6)	51.9 (11.1)	43.5 (6.4)	33.4 (0.8)	22.7 (−5.2)	15.2 (−9.3)	32.5 (0.3)
Average precipitation inches (mm)	0.68 (17)	0.51 (13)	0.87 (22)	1.85 (47)	3.39 (86)	3.22 (82)	1.70 (43)	1.67 (42)	1.46 (37)	1.25 (32)	0.71 (18)	0.55 (14)	17.86 (453)
Average snowfall inches (cm)	8.7 (22)	7.8 (20)	9.2 (23)	4.8 (12)	0.9 (2.3)	0.0 (0.0)	0.0 (0.0)	0.0 (0.0)	0.1 (0.25)	3.4 (8.6)	6.4 (16)	8.8 (22)	50.1 (126.15)
Source: NOAA

== Demographics ==
Historical population
Census	Pop.	Note	%±
1920	262		—
1930	212		−19.1%
1940	206		−2.8%
1950	234		13.6%
1960	222		−5.1%
1970	181		−18.5%
1980	139		−23.2%
1990	159		14.4%
2000	149		−6.3%
2010	110		−26.2%
2020	110		0.0%
U.S. Decennial Census

=== 2010 census ===
As of the census of 2010, there were 110 people, 61 households, and 29 families living in the town. The population density was 733.3 inhabitants per square mile (283.1/km^{2}). There were 82 housing units at an average density of 546.7 per square mile (211.1/km^{2}). The racial makeup of the town was 99.1% White and 0.9% from two or more races.

There were 61 households, of which 16.4% had children under the age of 18 living with them, 39.3% were married couples living together, 6.6% had a female householder with no husband present, 1.6% had a male householder with no wife present, and 52.5% were non-families. 47.5% of all households were made up of individuals, and 23% had someone living alone who was 65 years of age or older. The average household size was 1.80 and the average family size was 2.48.

The median age in the town was 55.5 years. 13.6% of residents were under the age of 18; 2.7% were between the ages of 18 and 24; 16.3% were from 25 to 44; 37.3% were from 45 to 64; and 30% were 65 years of age or older. The gender makeup of the town was 53.6% male and 46.4% female.

=== 2000 census ===
As of the census of 2000, there were 149 people, 67 households, and 42 families living in the town. The population density was 1,022.9 inhabitants per square mile (394.9/km^{2}). There were 80 housing units at an average density of 549.2 per square mile (212.0/km^{2}). The racial makeup of the town was 100.00% White.

There were 67 households, out of which 25.4% had children under the age of 18 living with them, 50.7% were married couples living together, 6.0% had a female householder with no husband present, and 37.3% were non-families. 32.8% of all households were made up of individuals, and 14.9% had someone living alone who was 65 years of age or older. The average household size was 2.22 and the average family size was 2.81.

In the town, the population was spread out, with 21.5% under the age of 18, 6.0% from 18 to 24, 22.1% from 25 to 44, 36.2% from 45 to 64, and 14.1% who were 65 years of age or older. The median age was 45 years. For every 100 females there were 101.4 males. For every 100 females age 18 and over, there were 108.9 males.

The median income for a household in the town was $19,375, and the median income for a family was $30,625. Males had a median income of $18,125 versus $0 for females. The per capita income for the town was $10,939. There were 37.5% of families and 44.4% of the population living below the poverty line, including 82.4% of under eighteens and 16.0% of those over 64.

== Government ==
Carol Clark ran unopposed for mayor in 2025.

== Education ==
Grass Range Public Schools educates students from kindergarten through 12th grade. They are known as the Rangers. Grass Range High School had 19 students in 2021.

== Notable people ==
- Thomas Siebel, corporate officer and owner of two ranches in the Grass Range area
- Clyde Summers (1918–2010), labor lawyer and law professor at Yale and Penn, subject of In re Summers

== See also ==
- List of municipalities in Montana
