= Fergus County, Montana =

County in Montana, United States

- County
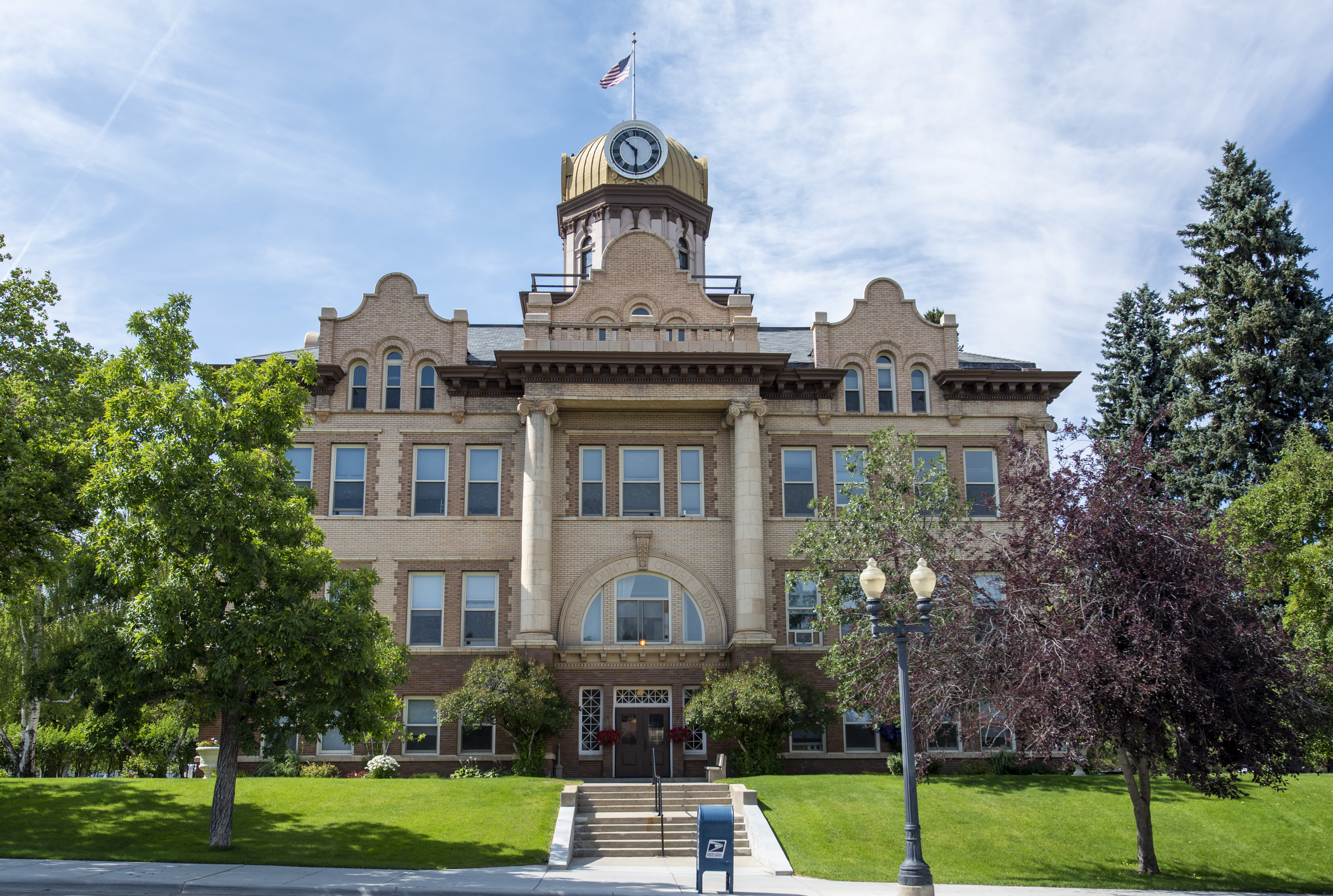
- Fergus County Courthouse in Lewistown

- Seal

- Location within the U.S. state of Montana
- Coordinates: 47°16′N 109°13′W
- Country: United States
- State: Montana
- Founded: 1885
- Named for: James Fergus
- Seat: Lewistown
- Largest city: Lewistown

Area
  - Total: 4,350 sq mi (11,300 km^{2})
  - Land: 4,340 sq mi (11,200 km^{2})
  - Water: 11 sq mi (28 km^{2}) 0.2%

Population (2020)
  - Total: 11,446
  - Estimate (2025): 11,825 ▲
  - Density: 2.7/sq mi (1.0/km^{2})
- Time zone: UTC−7 (Mountain)
  - Summer (DST): UTC−6 (MDT)
- Congressional district: 2nd
- Website: fergusmt.gov
- Montana county number 08

Fergus County is a county in the U.S. state of Montana. As of the 2020 census, the population was 11,446. Its county seat is Lewistown. The county was founded in 1885 and named for James Fergus, a Montana politician who was instrumental in creating the county.

== Geography ==
According to the United States Census Bureau, the county has a total area of 4,350 square miles (11,300 km^{2}), of which 4,340 square miles (11,200 km^{2}) is land and 11 square miles (28 km^{2}) (0.2%) is water. When established in 1886, Fergus County, Montana Territory, was a massive, undivided entity of 7,524 square miles. The county was centered around Lewistown, with 209 townships in a rapidly developing, expansive agricultural and mining region, prior to later divisions into Musselshell (part 1911), Judith Basin (part 1920), Golden Valley (4 October 1920 part from Musselshell), and Petroleum (1925) counties. To organize and administer old Fergus County, districts were created. These districts, rather than the townships, were used to enumerate the population in the 1900 Federal Census.

=== Adjacent counties ===
- Chouteau County – northwest
- Blaine County – north
- Phillips County – northeast
- Petroleum County – east
- Musselshell County – southeast
- Golden Valley County – south
- Wheatland County – southwest
- Judith Basin County – west

=== Major highways ===
- U.S. Highway 87
- U.S. Highway 191
- Montana Highway 3
- Montana Highway 80
- Montana Highway 81
- Montana Highway 200

=== National protected areas ===
- Charles M. Russell National Wildlife Refuge (part)
- Lewis and Clark National Forest (part)
- Upper Missouri River Breaks National Monument (part)

=== Military Installations ===
- LGM-30 Minuteman silos D-01 thru D-11 of the 10th Missile Squadron, 341st Missile Wing, 20th Air Force, assigned to Malmstrom AFB, Montana

== Demographics ==
Historical population
Census	Pop.	Note	%±
1890	3,514		—
1900	6,937		97.4%
1910	17,385		150.6%
1920	28,344		63.0%
1930	16,531		−41.7%
1940	14,040		−15.1%
1950	14,015		−0.2%
1960	14,018		0.0%
1970	12,611		−10.0%
1980	13,076		3.7%
1990	12,083		−7.6%
2000	11,893		−1.6%
2010	11,586		−2.6%
2020	11,446		−1.2%
2025 (est.)	11,825	▲	3.3%
U.S. Decennial Census

=== 2020 census ===
As of the 2020 census, the county had a population of 11,446. Of the residents, 20.7% were under the age of 18 and 26.3% were 65 years of age or older; the median age was 47.5 years. For every 100 females there were 102.4 males, and for every 100 females age 18 and over there were 99.6 males. 52.6% of residents lived in urban areas and 47.4% lived in rural areas.

The racial makeup of the county was 93.2% White, 0.2% Black or African American, 1.2% American Indian and Alaska Native, 0.3% Asian, 0.5% from some other race, and 4.6% from two or more races. Hispanic or Latino residents of any race comprised 2.0% of the population.

There were 5,032 households in the county, of which 23.8% had children under the age of 18 living with them and 23.9% had a female householder with no spouse or partner present. About 34.8% of all households were made up of individuals and 17.9% had someone living alone who was 65 years of age or older.

There were 6,013 housing units, of which 16.3% were vacant. Among occupied housing units, 72.2% were owner-occupied and 27.8% were renter-occupied. The homeowner vacancy rate was 2.7% and the rental vacancy rate was 10.2%.

=== 2010 census ===
As of the 2010 census, there were 11,586 people, 5,099 households, and 3,202 families living in the county. The population density was 2.7 inhabitants per square mile (1.0/km^{2}). There were 5,836 housing units at an average density of 1.3 per square mile (0.50/km^{2}). The racial makeup of the county was 96.6% white, 1.2% American Indian, 0.2% black or African American, 0.2% Asian, 0.2% from other races, and 1.5% from two or more races. Those of Hispanic or Latino origin made up 1.5% of the population. In terms of ancestry, 30.8% were German, 15.9% were English, 14.7% were Norwegian, 12.8% were Irish, and 4.2% were American.

Of the 5,099 households, 23.8% had children under the age of 18 living with them, 52.9% were married couples living together, 6.5% had a female householder with no husband present, 37.2% were non-families, and 32.6% of all households were made up of individuals. The average household size was 2.18 and the average family size was 2.75. The median age was 47.8 years.

The median income for a household in the county was $37,607 and the median income for a family was $48,623. Males had a median income of $35,110 versus $21,225 for females. The per capita income for the county was $22,295. About 12.5% of families and 14.7% of the population were below the poverty line, including 24.2% of those under age 18 and 9.3% of those age 65 or over.

== Politics ==
Since the 1964 election, the Republican candidate has been selected in every election.

United States presidential election results for Fergus County, Montana
Year	Republican		Democratic		Third party(ies)	
Year	No.	%	No.	%	No.	%
1892	766	55.59%	560	40.64%	52	3.77%
1896	725	46.41%	834	53.39%	3	0.19%
1900	1,228	56.93%	913	42.33%	16	0.74%
1904	1,599	63.23%	780	30.84%	150	5.93%
1908	1,529	52.43%	1,112	38.13%	275	9.43%
1912	745	20.34%	1,393	38.03%	1,525	41.63%
1916	3,290	34.91%	5,749	61.00%	385	4.09%
1920	5,858	60.22%	3,371	34.66%	498	5.12%
1924	2,942	38.50%	1,580	20.68%	3,120	40.83%
1928	4,109	60.09%	2,667	39.00%	62	0.91%
1932	2,400	33.63%	4,470	62.64%	266	3.73%
1936	1,821	27.00%	4,675	69.31%	249	3.69%
1940	2,706	40.88%	3,873	58.51%	40	0.60%
1944	2,229	41.11%	3,164	58.35%	29	0.53%
1948	2,411	42.66%	3,059	54.12%	182	3.22%
1952	4,402	65.79%	2,271	33.94%	18	0.27%
1956	3,771	57.77%	2,757	42.23%	0	0.00%
1960	3,294	52.24%	2,999	47.56%	13	0.21%
1964	2,980	47.35%	3,300	52.44%	13	0.21%
1968	3,367	55.59%	2,070	34.18%	620	10.24%
1972	4,082	67.48%	1,652	27.31%	315	5.21%
1976	3,556	57.73%	2,470	40.10%	134	2.18%
1980	4,455	65.02%	1,840	26.85%	557	8.13%
1984	4,585	70.99%	1,804	27.93%	70	1.08%
1988	3,948	64.55%	2,052	33.55%	116	1.90%
1992	2,736	42.16%	1,615	24.88%	2,139	32.96%
1996	3,671	59.27%	1,866	30.13%	657	10.61%
2000	4,353	72.62%	1,352	22.56%	289	4.82%
2004	4,425	72.22%	1,582	25.82%	120	1.96%
2008	4,108	65.92%	1,933	31.02%	191	3.06%
2012	4,257	70.12%	1,640	27.01%	174	2.87%
2016	4,269	73.10%	1,202	20.58%	369	6.32%
2020	4,869	74.83%	1,496	22.99%	142	2.18%
2024	4,965	73.97%	1,522	22.68%	225	3.35%

== Communities ==
=== City ===
- Lewistown (county seat)

=== Towns ===
- Denton
- Grass Range
- Moore
- Winifred

=== Unincorporated communities ===
- Amherst
- Buffalo
- Christina
- Eddies Corner
- Fergus
- Forest Grove
- Garneill
- Giltedge
- Hanover
- Heath
- Hoosac
- Maiden
- Moore
- Piper
- Roy
- Straw
- Valentine
- Ware

== Former communities ==
Moulton

== Census-designated places ==
- Ayers Ranch Colony
- Brooks
- Coffee Creek
- Danvers
- Deerfield Colony
- Fords Creek Colony
- Hilger
- King Ranch Colony
- Lewistown Heights
- Roy
- Spring Creek Colony
- Warm Spring Creek

== Notable people ==
- Roy E. Ayers, member of the United States House of Representatives and 11th Governor of Montana; served as the attorney of the county from 1905 to 1909.
- Carl W. Riddick, House of Representatives from the Second District of Montana, served as County Assessor of Fergus County.

== See also ==
- List of lakes in Fergus County, Montana
- List of mountains in Fergus County, Montana
- National Register of Historic Places listings in Fergus County, Montana
