= Lewistown, Montana =

City in Montana, United States

- City
- Main Street in Lewistown

- Flag Logo
- Motto(s): "Home of Big Springs and the purest drinking water in the world!"
- Location of Lewistown, Montana

- Location in the United States
- Coordinates: 47°4′0″N 109°25′25″W
- Country: United States
- State: Montana
- County: Fergus

Area
  - Total: 5.72 sq mi (14.82 km^{2})
  - Land: 5.72 sq mi (14.82 km^{2})
  - Water: 0 sq mi (0.00 km^{2})
- Elevation: 4,121 ft (1,256 m)

Population (2020)
  - Total: 5,952
  - Density: 1,040/sq mi (401.6/km^{2})
- Time zone: UTC-07:00 (MST)
  - Summer (DST): UTC-06:00 (MDT)
- ZIP code: 59457
- Area code: 406
- FIPS code: 30-43375
- GNIS feature ID: 2410827
- Website: http://www.cityoflewistown.com

Lewistown is a city in and the county seat of Fergus County, Montana, United States. The population was 5,952 at the 2020 census. Lewistown is located in the geographic center of the state, southeast of Great Falls and northwest of Billings. First planned in 1882, it was the site of an 1880s gold rush, and served as an important railway destination, supplying surrounding communities with bricks via rail.

== History ==
The area was the territory of the Blackfoot Native Americans. In 1874, Fort Lewis was established there by Company "F" of the 7th U.S. Infantry to provide military protection for people traveling on the Carroll Trail, then the shortest route between Carroll, Montana and Helena. Lewistown is named after this fort.

The first permanent settlers of Lewistown were Métis. The Metis established Lewistown in 1879. Pierre Berger is credited with being the founder of Lewistown. Berger, along with his wife Judith Wilkie Berger, son Isadore Berger, Isaie Berger, Jean Baptiste Berger and Jacques Berger, as well as several other families made the trek into the Lewistown area in 1879. Francis Janeaux came with the second group. Janeaux founded the first public school house in 1883. Lewistown became an incorporated city in 1899.

Lewistown was the site of a gold rush when gold was discovered in the nearby Judith Mountains in 1880. Before the gold rush, Maiden was the largest city in central Montana. When the gold supply ran out, many of the miners gained new employment in Lewistown and settled there permanently.

Lewistown was the eastern terminus of the Montana Railroad which connected with Lombard, Montana, a distance of approximately 157 miles (253 km). The railroad connected with the national railway network via a connection with the Northern Pacific Railway at Lombard. The Montana Railroad line was constructed between 1895 and 1903, and operated independently until 1908, when it was acquired by the Chicago, Milwaukee, St. Paul and Pacific Railroad ("the Milwaukee Road").

During World War II, in 1942 the US Army Air Corps established a Boeing B-17 Flying Fortress training base just west of Lewistown to train aircrews for missions in North Africa and Europe. The former airbase is now the Lewistown Municipal Airport, which is home to the last remaining Norden bombsight storage facility, used to keep the device safe from theft by enemy spies during World War II . The city park displays a Minuteman III ballistic missile.

== Geography ==
U.S. Highway 87 intersects with U.S. Route 191 in town.

According to the United States Census Bureau, the city has a total area of 5.32 square miles (13.78 km^{2}), all land.

The city is located in the exact center of the state of Montana and is part of the Rocky Mountains. The city's water source is Big Spring Creek, which originates in the foothills of the Big Snowy Mountains 6 miles (9.7 km) south of Lewistown.

=== Climate ===
Lewistown experiences a relatively dry humid continental climate (Köppen Dfb) with long, dry and usually cold winters and short, warm, wetter summers. Winter weather can either be severe due to the movement of cold polar air from Canada, or occasionally very mild or even warm due to gusty chinook winds. On average 9.3 afternoons will reach 50 °F (10 °C) during the three winter months, but on the other hand, 46.6 afternoons during a full year will fail to top freezing, 0 °F (−17.8 °C) is reached on 21.5 mornings and −25 °F (−31.7 °C) on two mornings each winter, with as many as twelve this cold during the severe winter of 1928–29. Temperatures do not consistently stay above freezing until June: the average window for freezing temperatures is from September 19 to May 23 – allowing a "growing season" of 92 days – and for subfreezing maxima from October 26 to April 2. The hottest temperature at Lewistown has been 105 °F (40.6 °C) on June 21, 1900 and July 31, 1900, and the coldest −46 °F (−43.3 °C) on 28 January 1929. The hottest minimum has been 71 °F (21.7 °C) on July 17, 1925, and the coldest maximum −28 °F (−33.3 °C) on January 29, 1916; the coldest month was January 1950 which averaged −1.8 °F (−18.8 °C).

During the summer, days are very warm, but nights remain cool and rare freezes have occurred. Most precipitation is from spring thunderstorms: the wettest calendar year has been 1953 with 28.61 inches (726.7 mm) and the driest 2021 with 10.91 inches (277.1 mm). Despite the dry conditions, winter snowfall is substantial with an average of 63.1 inches (1.60 m); however the frequent chinooks keep mean snow cover down to 9 inches (0.23 m) in January. The most snow on the ground has been 33 inches (0.84 m) on February 1 and 2, 1978. February 1978 also had the highest mean snow cover at 27.1 inches or 0.69 metres; the snowiest year has been 1955 with 172.5 inches (4.38 m) and the least snowy was 1992 with only 30.2 inches (0.77 m), and the most snow in a month 41.0 inches (1.04 m) during March 1954.

Climate data for Lewistown, Montana (Lewistown Municipal Airport), 1991–2020 normals, extremes 1896–present
Month	Jan	Feb	Mar	Apr	May	Jun	Jul	Aug	Sep	Oct	Nov	Dec	Year
Record high °F (°C)	73 (23)	70 (21)	88 (31)	89 (32)	98 (37)	105 (41)	105 (41)	103 (39)	100 (38)	92 (33)	81 (27)	74 (23)	105 (41)
Mean maximum °F (°C)	54.4 (12.4)	54.3 (12.4)	64.2 (17.9)	74.8 (23.8)	80.4 (26.9)	87.6 (30.9)	94.1 (34.5)	94.5 (34.7)	90.0 (32.2)	79.5 (26.4)	65.9 (18.8)	53.9 (12.2)	96.5 (35.8)
Mean daily maximum °F (°C)	34.4 (1.3)	35.3 (1.8)	44.3 (6.8)	53.0 (11.7)	62.6 (17.0)	71.0 (21.7)	81.6 (27.6)	81.1 (27.3)	70.4 (21.3)	56.0 (13.3)	43.4 (6.3)	35.0 (1.7)	55.7 (13.2)
Daily mean °F (°C)	23.7 (−4.6)	24.6 (−4.1)	32.9 (0.5)	40.9 (4.9)	50.0 (10.0)	58.0 (14.4)	66.1 (18.9)	65.4 (18.6)	55.9 (13.3)	43.4 (6.3)	32.1 (0.1)	24.3 (−4.3)	43.1 (6.2)
Mean daily minimum °F (°C)	12.9 (−10.6)	13.9 (−10.1)	21.4 (−5.9)	28.8 (−1.8)	37.4 (3.0)	45.1 (7.3)	50.7 (10.4)	49.6 (9.8)	41.5 (5.3)	30.8 (−0.7)	20.9 (−6.2)	13.6 (−10.2)	30.6 (−0.8)
Mean minimum °F (°C)	−14.6 (−25.9)	−9.6 (−23.1)	−1.2 (−18.4)	12.9 (−10.6)	24.5 (−4.2)	34.2 (1.2)	41.3 (5.2)	39.0 (3.9)	28.6 (−1.9)	12.5 (−10.8)	−2.8 (−19.3)	−11.2 (−24.0)	−23.1 (−30.6)
Record low °F (°C)	−46 (−43)	−42 (−41)	−34 (−37)	−17 (−27)	11 (−12)	23 (−5)	27 (−3)	27 (−3)	6 (−14)	−10 (−23)	−30 (−34)	−42 (−41)	−46 (−43)
Average precipitation inches (mm)	0.58 (15)	0.49 (12)	0.87 (22)	1.71 (43)	2.88 (73)	3.35 (85)	1.76 (45)	1.69 (43)	1.39 (35)	1.27 (32)	0.67 (17)	0.51 (13)	17.17 (435)
Average snowfall inches (cm)	9.6 (24)	5.1 (13)	12.0 (30)	8.0 (20)	4.8 (12)	0.1 (0.25)	0.0 (0.0)	0.0 (0.0)	1.6 (4.1)	3.9 (9.9)	7.5 (19)	10.5 (27)	63.1 (159.25)
Average precipitation days (≥ 0.01 in)	7.7	8.2	9.1	11.7	13.7	13.6	10.3	9.0	8.5	9.4	7.4	7.3	115.9
Average snowy days (≥ 0.1 in)	7.9	6.3	8.4	5.7	2.0	0.1	0.0	0.0	1.2	3.2	6.2	8.6	49.6
Source 1: NOAA (average snow/snow days 1981–2010)
Source 2: National Weather Service

== Demographics ==
Historical population
Census	Pop.	Note	%±
1880	72		—
1890	785		990.3%
1900	1,096		39.6%
1910	2,992		173.0%
1920	6,120		104.5%
1930	5,358		−12.5%
1940	5,874		9.6%
1950	6,573		11.9%
1960	7,408		12.7%
1970	6,437		−13.1%
1980	7,104		10.4%
1990	6,051		−14.8%
2000	5,813		−3.9%
2010	5,901		1.5%
2020	5,952		0.9%
2023 (est.)	6,149		3.3%
source: U.S. Decennial Census

=== 2020 census ===
As of the 2020 census, Lewistown had a population of 5,952. The median age was 44.0 years. 20.6% of residents were under the age of 18 and 25.4% of residents were 65 years of age or older. For every 100 females there were 96.8 males, and for every 100 females age 18 and over there were 95.2 males age 18 and over.

95.8% of residents lived in urban areas, while 4.2% lived in rural areas.

There were 2,743 households in Lewistown, of which 23.6% had children under the age of 18 living in them. Of all households, 39.2% were married-couple households, 23.1% were households with a male householder and no spouse or partner present, and 30.5% were households with a female householder and no spouse or partner present. About 40.7% of all households were made up of individuals and 20.8% had someone living alone who was 65 years of age or older.

There were 3,107 housing units, of which 11.7% were vacant. The homeowner vacancy rate was 3.0% and the rental vacancy rate was 11.7%.

Racial composition as of the 2020 census
Race	Number	Percent
White	5,455	91.6%
Black or African American	14	0.2%
American Indian and Alaska Native	105	1.8%
Asian	34	0.6%
Native Hawaiian and Other Pacific Islander	0	0.0%
Some other race	30	0.5%
Two or more races	314	5.3%
Hispanic or Latino (of any race)	158	2.7%

=== 2010 census ===
As of the census of 2010, there were 5,901 people, 2,761 households, and 1,512 families living in the city. The population density was 1,109.2 inhabitants per square mile (428.3/km^{2}). There were 3,007 housing units at an average density of 565.2 per square mile (218.2/km^{2}). The racial makeup of the city was 95.4% White, 0.3% African American, 1.7% Native American, 0.4% Asian, 0.3% from other races, and 2.0% from two or more races. Hispanic or Latino people of any race were 2.1% of the population.

There were 2,761 households, of which 23.7% had children under the age of 18 living with them, 42.7% were married couples living together, 8.3% had a female householder with no husband present, 3.7% had a male householder with no wife present, and 45.2% were non-families. 39.8% of all households were made up of individuals, and 18.8% had someone living alone who was 65 years of age or older. The average household size was 2.07 and the average family size was 2.78.

The median age in the city was 45.4 years. 20.4% of residents were under the age of 18; 6.5% were between the ages of 18 and 24; 22.6% were from 25 to 44; 28.9% were from 45 to 64; and 21.7% were 65 years of age or older. The gender makeup of the city was 49.2% male and 50.8% female.

=== 2000 census ===
As of the census of 2000, there were 5,813 people, 2,594 households, and 1,507 families living in the city. The population density was 3,055.3 inhabitants per square mile (1,179.7/km^{2}). There were 2,868 housing units at an average density of 1,507.4 per square mile (582.0/km^{2}).

The racial makeup of the city was 96.53% White, 0.07% African American, 1.41% Native American, 0.34% Asian, 0.14% from other races, and 1.51% from two or more races. Hispanic or Latino people of any race were 0.72% of the population.

There were 2,594 households, out of which 26.1% had children under the age of 18 living with them, 46.5% were married couples living together, 8.6% had a female householder with no husband present, and 41.9% were non-families. 37.7% of all households were made up of individuals, and 18.4% had someone living alone who was 65 years of age or older. The average household size was 2.18 and the average family size was 2.88.

In the city, the population was spread out, with 23.5% under the age of 18, 6.8% from 18 to 24, 23.2% from 25 to 44, 23.6% from 45 to 64, and 22.8% who were 65 years of age or older. The median age was 43 years. For every 100 females there were 87.5 males. For every 100 females age 18 and over, there were 84.4 males.

The median income for a household in the city was $28,949, and the median income for a family was $36,888. Males had a median income of $30,231 versus $20,019 for females. The per capita income for the city was $16,817. About 9.0% of families and 13.6% of the population were below the poverty line, including 17.3% of those under age 18 and 12.0% of those age 65 or over.

== Arts and culture ==
The town has nine parks, a softball complex, and over twenty miles of trails. East Fork Reservoir allows fishing and boating. A fish hatchery is seven miles from town and the site includes a baseball diamond, volleyball area, and feeding pond.

Lewistown has a public library, the Lewistown Public Library.

=== Annual events ===
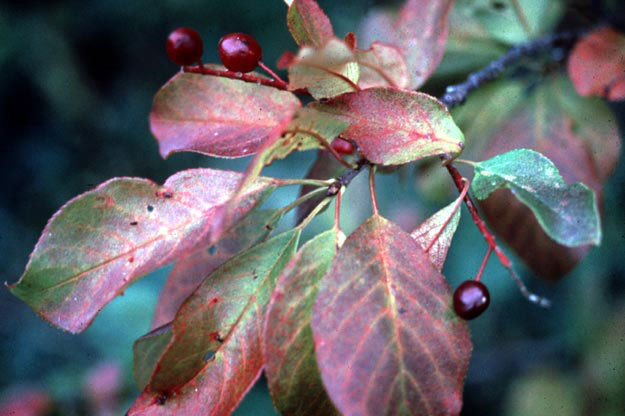
Chokecherries

The Chokecherry Festival is an annual event that includes a pancake breakfast, chokecherry culinary contest, pit spitting contest, and live entertainment. The event has been held since 1989.

The Metis Celebration, held on Labor Day weekend, includes a pow wow, fiddling, jigging, and other Métis related activities. 2015 marked the 21st year for the festival.

Each year the Central Montana Fair includes the RAM PRCA Rodeo. The rodeo includes bareback riding, saddle bronc riding, steer wrestling, team roping, tie-down roping, ladies barrel racing, steer roping, and bull riding.

The Montana Cowboy Poetry Gathering and Western Music Rendezvous is held every August. It is the second oldest cowboy poetry gathering in the country.

== Government ==
The city commission is the governing body of Lewistown. They hire a city manager who is the administrative head of city government. The commission has six members representing three wards and one at large member for a total of seven members. Members are elected for four years.

== Education ==
Lewistown Public Schools educates students from kindergarten through 12th grade. There are three elementary schools, a middle school, and Fergus High School. They are known as the Golden Eagles.

== Media ==
Radio

- KXLO AM 1230 – 1,000 watts; country music
- KQPZ FM 95.9 – 3,000 watts; classic rock. modern rock

Newspaper

- Lewistown News-Argus

== Infrastructure ==
Lewistown Municipal Airport is two miles southwest of town.

== Notable people ==
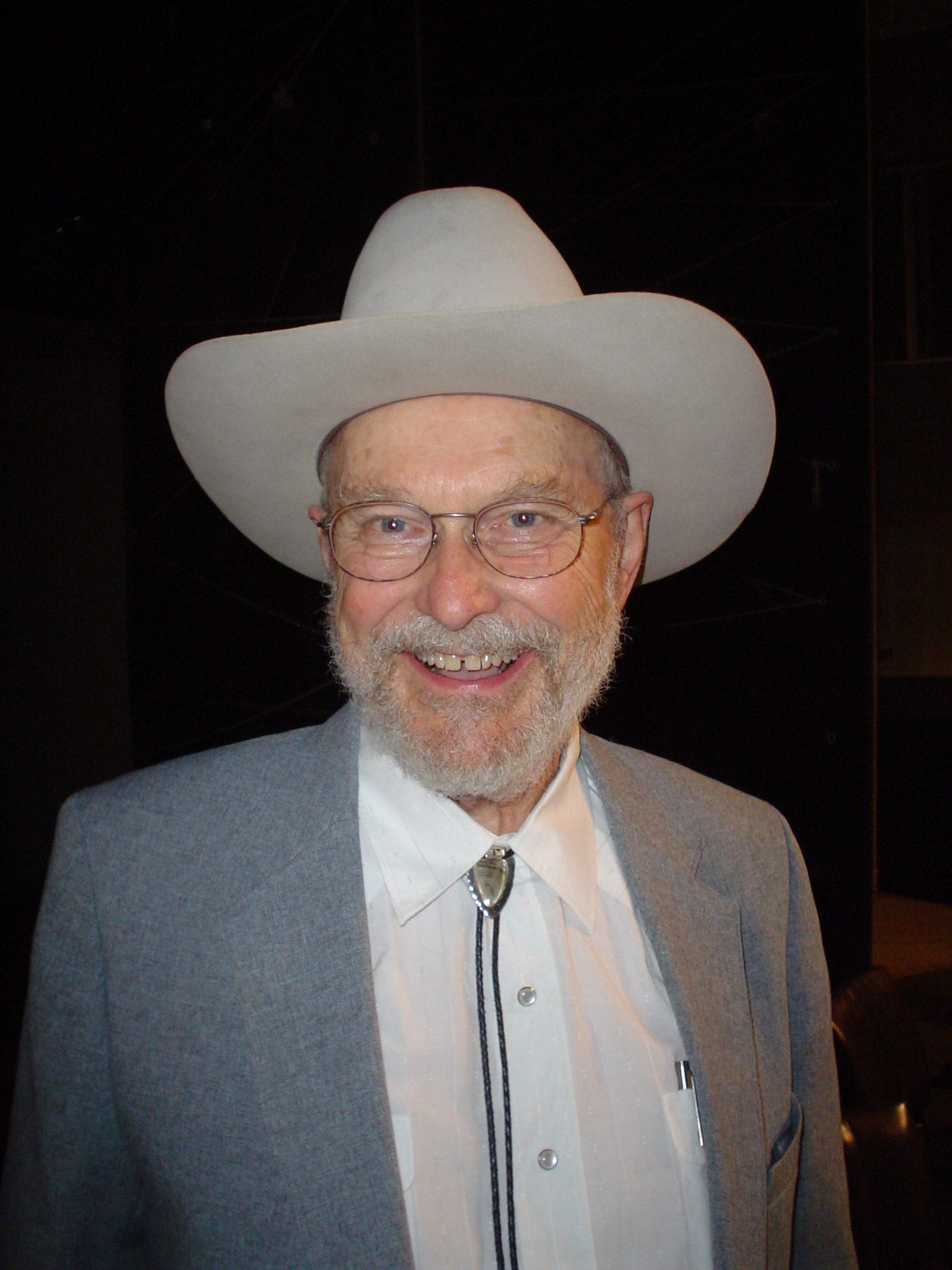
Loren Acton in 2009

- Loren Acton, astronaut and physicist
- Roy E. Ayers, governor and congressman
- Edward Butcher, politician
- Alma Smith Jacobs, first African American Montana State Librarian
- Ed McGivern, shooter, instructor, author of Fast and Fancy Revolver Shooting
- Jim Otten, MLB pitcher for the Chicago White Sox and St. Louis Cardinals
- Bobby Petrino, former head football coach
- Rick Rydell, radio talk show host and author
- Tom Stout, congressman
- Mike Taylor, politician and rancher
- Roger Youderian, Christian missionary
