= List of hillside letters in Montana =

Letter F above Frenchtown, Montana

Letter C seen from I-90 in Columbus

This is a list of hillside letters (also known as mountain monograms) in the U.S. state of Montana. There are at least 120 hillside letters, acronyms, and messages in the state. While western Montana provides plenty of mountains to support these monograms, many towns in the eastern prairie have also placed them on whatever hill they can find.

== Existing letters ==
Monogram	Town	Description	Location
A (with graduating class year)	Absarokee		45.5172°N 109.4376°W
A	Alberton		46.9871°N 114.4716°W
A (with graduating class year)	Anaconda		46.1174°N 112.9706°W
A	Arlee		47.1565°N 114.0948°W
A	Avon		46.6040°N 112.5954°W
A (with graduating class year)	Augusta	Augusta School District	47.5263°N 112.3674°W
B	Dillon	Beaverhead County High School	45.2389°N 112.6676°W
B	Bainville		48.1336°N 104.2228°W
B	Belfry		45.1453°N 109.0190°W
B (with graduating class year)	Belt	Belt Public Schools	47.3881°N 110.9190°W
B	Bloomfield		47.4200°N 104.9150°W
B	Bozeman	Bozeman High School	45.7241°N 110.9825°W
B	Bridger		45.2953°N 108.9282°W
B	Broadus		45.4479°N 105.4107°W
B (with graduating class year)	Broadview	Broadview Grade and High School	46.0931°N 108.8799°W
B (Previously BHS with graduating class year)	Brockton	Brockton School District	48.1569°N 104.9183°W
C (With graduating class years painted nearby)	Ekalaka	Carter County High School	Not visible in aerial imagery 45.8953°N 104.5391°W
C (With graduating class year)	Cascade		47.2815°N 111.7103°W
C (with graduating class year)	Centerville	Centerville High School	47.3863°N 111.1388°W
C	Anaconda	Anaconda High School	46.114°N 112.9512°W
C	Charlo		47.4502°N 114.256°W
C (With thirty-year reunion class year)	Choteau	Choteau High School	47.7779°N 112.2054°E
C	Circle		47.4255°N 105.5889°W
C	Columbus		45.6521°N 109.2505°W
C	Corvallis		46.3359°N 114.0261°W
C	Culbertson		48.1502°N 104.5282°W
CMR (With graduating class year)	Great Falls	C.M. Russell High School	47.4928°N 111.3487°W
D	Darby	Darby High School	46.0248°N 114.1649°W
D (With graduating class year)	Denton		47.3124°N 109.9366°W
D	Sčilíp		47.3375°N 114.3276°W
D	Drummond		46.6701°N 113.1407°W
D	Dutton		47.8338°N 111.7406°W
E	Ennis		45.3505°N 111.7478°W
E	Ellistion		46.5662°N 112.4239°W
F	Fallon		46.8601°N 105.1090°W
F	Lewistown	Fergus High School	47.0541°N 109.4230°W
F	Kalispell	Flathead High School	48.1793°N 114.3816°W
F	Flaxville	Flaxville Public Schools (closed in 2006)	48.4752°N 105.0803°W
F	Forsyth		46.2613°N 106.674°W
F	Foy Lake		48.1792°N 114.3817°W
F	Frazer		48.0687°N 106.0754°W
F	Frenchtown		47.0218°N 114.2212°W
FB (with graduating class year)	Ft. Benton		47.8101°N 110.6626°W
Fish	Livingston	Blue Ribbon Fishing Tours	45.6708°N 110.5641°W
G	Gardiner		45.038°N 110.7062°W
G (with graduating class year)	Geraldine		47.6057°N 110.287°W
G	Geyser		47.2861°N 110.5089°W
G	Glasgow		48.2118°N 106.6395°W
G	Philipsburg	Granite High School	46.3306°N 113.283°W
GR	Grass Range		47.027°N 108.8087°W
GF	Great Falls	Great Falls High School	47.5218°N 111.3353°W
H	Hamilton		46.2342°N 114.2315°W
H	Harlowton		46.4445°N 109.8154°W
H (with graduating class year)	Havre	Havre High School	48.5232°N 109.6386°W
H	Havre	Havre High School	48.5468°N 109.6873°W
H	Helena		46.5908°N 112.0599°W
H	Highwood		47.5801°N 110.7935°W
H	Hinsdale		48.3778°N 107.0964°W
H	Hot Springs		47.6263°N 114.651°W
H	Hysham		46.2624°N 107.2249°W
J	Jackson		45.3805°N 113.3982°W (uncertain location)
J	Boulder	Jefferson High School	46.2448°N 112.1486°W
J	Joliet		45.4808°N 108.9598°W
J	Jordan		47.3151°N 106.8984°W
JG	Judith Gap		46.6876°N 109.7427°W
K	Klein		46.4006°N 108.5512°W
L (rock)	Lavina		46.3114°N 108.9335°W
L (painted)	Lavina		Not visible in aerial imagery 46.2915°N 108.9273°W
L	Libby		48.3943°N 115.5087°W
L	Lima		44.6185°N 112.5784°W
L (with graduating class year)	Lincoln	Lincoln Public Schools	46.9567°N 112.7167°W
L	Lockwood	Lockwood High School	45.7935°N 108.4356°W
L	Eureka	Lincoln County High School	48.8842°N 115.0561°W
L	Missoula	Loyola High School	46.8728°N 113.9685°W
M	Melstone		46.6035°N 107.8714°W
M	St. Ignatius	Mission High School	47.3007°N 114.1066°W
M (Originally an A)	Bozeman	Montana State University	45.7144°N 110.9735°W
M	Butte	Montana Tech, built 1910	46.0191°N 112.5587°W
M	Missoula	University of Montana, built 1909	46.8594°N 113.9757°W
M	Dillon	University of Montana Western	45.2209°N 112.6671°W
Montana State Prison	Deer Lodge	Montana State Prison	46.3944°N 112.7947°W
Morning Star (Cheyenne Symbol)	Lame Deer	Northern Cheyenne	45.6173°N 106.6591°W
N	Nashua		48.1381°N 106.3566°W
N	Havre	Montana State University Northern	48.5469°N 109.6865°W
P	Livingston	Park High School	45.6714°N 110.5624°W
PC	Park City		
P	Plains		47.4619°N 114.8720°W
P	Polson		47.6798°N 114.1471°W
P (With graduating class year)	Deer Lodge	Powell County High School	46.4222°N 112.7599°W
Peace Symbol	Missoula	Jeannette Rankin	46.8775°N 113.9871°W
RL	Red Lodge		45.1766°N 109.2425°W
R	Redstone		48.8237°N 104.9505°W
R	Reed Point		45.7026°N 109.5424°W
R	Roberts		45.3764°N 109.1864°W
R	Rosebud		46.273°N 106.4372°W
R	Roy		47.3227°N 108.9527°W
R	Ryegate		46.3023°N 109.2568°W
S	Scobey	Scobey Schools	48.7907°N 105.4014°W
S	Shelby		48.5195°N 111.8671°W
S	Sheridan	Sheridan K-12 Schools	45.4514°N 112.1251°W
S	Stanford		47.1655°N 110.2724°W
S	Superior		47.1955°N 114.8791°W
SGHS	Big Timber	Sweet Grass County High School	45.8191°N 109.9595°W
S	Billings	Skyview High School	45.8302°N 108.5155°W
T	Terry		46.81058°N 105.3153°W
T	Three Forks		45.8864°N 111.6501°W
T	Troy	Troy High School	48.4604°N 115.9060°W
TB	Twin Bridges		45.5653°N 112.3127°W
TF	Thompson Falls		47.5987°N 115.4034°W
U	Ulm		47.4387°N 111.4999°W
U	Utica		46.9693°N 110.0945°W
V	Victor		46.4396°N 114.1992°W
W	Deer Lodge	Powell County HS Wardens	46.3935°N 112.7295°W
W	Westby		48.8663°N 104.0768°W
W	Whitehall		45.9103°N 112.0373°W
W	Wibaux	Wibaux County High School	46.9917°N 104.1951°W
W	Windham		47.084°N 110.139°W
W	Winifred		47.5651°N 109.3685°W
W	Winnett		46.992°N 108.3458°W
WP (With graduating class year)	Wolf Point		48.1006°N 105.6253°W

== Missing or Unmaintained Letters ==
Monogram	Town	Description	Location
A (now an M)	Bozeman	Montana A&M (now Montana State University)	45.7144°N 110.9735°W
C (no longer exists)	Helena	Carroll College	46.5704°N 112.0299°W
C (uncertain existence)	Colstrip		45.8850°N 106.6331°W (uncertain location)
D (uncertain existence)	Glendive	Dawson County High School	(uncertain location)
F (uncertain existence)	Fromberg		45.3886°N 108.9209°W (uncertain location)
H (no longer exists)	Missoula	Hellgate High School	46.8624°N 113.9966°W (uncertain location)
KG (uncertain existence)	Gildford	Kremlin-Gildford High School (closed)	48.5698°N 110.3000°W (uncertain location)
L (no longer exists)	Lewistown		(uncertain location)
M (uncertain existence)	Malta		48.3549°N 107.8701°W (uncertain location)
R (no longer exists)	Billings	Rocky Mountain College	45.8023°N 108.5547°W (uncertain location)
R (uncertain existence)	Roundup		46.4381°N 108.5376°W (uncertain location)
R (uncertain existence)	Saint Regis		47.3064°N 115.1053°W (uncertain location)
S (no longer exists)	Missoula	Sentinel High School	46.847°N 114.0099°W
