= Montana Highway 80 =

State highway in Montana, United States

Montana Highway 80
- MT 80 highlighted in red

Route information
- Maintained by MDT
- Length: 67.172 mi (108.103 km)

Major junctions
- South end: US 87 / MT 3 / MT 200 at Stanford
- MT 81 north of Arrow Creek
- North end: US 87 at Fort Benton

Location
- Country: United States
- State: Montana
- Counties: Judith Basin, Fergus, Chouteau

Highway system
- Montana Highway System; Interstate; US; State; Secondary
← MT 78	→ MT 81

Montana Highway 80 (MT 80) is a 67.172-mile-long (108.103 km) north–south state highway in the U.S. State of Montana. MT 80's southern terminus is at U.S. Route 87 (US 87), MT 3 and MT 200 in the community of Stanford and the northern terminus is at US 87 in the town of Fort Benton. The landscape is hilly and rural, and largely used for wheat farming; the road also passes through Arrow Creek Canyon and near the Highwood Mountains. Between Arrow Creek and Geraldine, MT 80 is roughly paralleled by the main line of Central Montana Rail.

== History ==
Before receiving its current designation, Highway 80 was designated as Montana Secondary Highway 230.

== Major intersections ==
County	Location	mi	km	Destinations	Notes
Judith Basin	Stanford	0.000	0.000	US 87 / MT 3 / MT 200 – Lewistown, Great Falls	
Fergus		17.394	27.993	MT 81 east – Denton	
Chouteau		64.560	103.899	S-228 south	
Chouteau	Fort Benton	65.193	104.918	S-386	
Chouteau	Fort Benton	65.614	105.595	S-387 north	
Chouteau		67.172	108.103	US 87 / S-223 – Great Falls, Havre, Chester	
1.000 mi = 1.609 km; 1.000 km = 0.621 mi
