= Galt (surname) =

Galt is a surname. Notable people with the surname include:

== People ==
- Alexander Tilloch Galt (1817–1893), politician and a major figure in the Canadian Confederation
- Annabel Galt (1868–1938), American educator and missionary in Thailand
- Edith Galt (1872–1961), second wife of President Woodrow Wilson
- Elliott Torrance Galt (1850–1928), Canadian businessman and developer
- Jimmy Galt (1885–1935), Scottish footballer
- John Galt (novelist) (1779–1839), Scottish writer, entrepreneur, political commentator and founder of Guelph, Ontario
- Malcolm Patrick Galt (1929-2022), Roman Catholic bishop of the diocese of Bridgetown, Barbados
- Maud Galt (c.1620–c.1670), lesbian accused of witchcraft in Scotland
- Minnie Galt Braithwaite Jenkins (1874–1954), American educator and school-teacher
- Thomas Galt (1805–1857), American Presbyterian minister, abolitionist and a leader of the Illinois Anti-Slavery Society
- William Wylie Galt (1919-1945), United States Army officer and recipient of the Congressional Medal of Honor
- William W. Galt (Minnesota politician) (1854-1945), American farmer and politician
- Tögöldur Galt (born 1995), Mongolian footballer
- Wylie Galt (born 1984), American politician

== Fictional characters ==
- John Galt, hero of Ayn Rand's novel Atlas Shrugged
- Arthur Galt, an antagonist from the 1982 action film First Blood
