= Montana Highway 81 =

State highway in Montana, United States

Montana Highway 81
- MT 81 highlighted in red

Route information
- Maintained by MDT
- Length: 42.446 mi (68.310 km)

Major junctions
- West end: MT 80 north of Arrow Creek
- East end: US 191 at Brooks

Location
- Country: United States
- State: Montana
- Counties: Fergus

Highway system
- Montana Highway System; Interstate; US; State; Secondary
← MT 80	→ MT 82

Montana Highway 81 (MT 81) is a state highway in the U.S. state of Montana. The highway begins at an intersection with MT 80 north of the hamlet of Arrow Creek. The highway extends eastward from this point for approximately 42 miles (68 km), ending at an intersection with U.S. Route 191 (US 191) at the post office of Brooks. The landscape traversed by MT 81 is uneven and largely rural, used mainly for agriculture and livestock grazing. For much of its length, the highway is roughly paralleled by the main line of Central Montana Rail, which is headquartered in Denton.

Before receiving its current designation, MT 81 was designated as Secondary Highway 235.

== Major intersections ==
The entire route is in Fergus County.

Location	mi	km	Destinations	Notes
	0.000	0.000	MT 80 – Stanford, Fort Benton	Western terminus
Denton	13.161	21.181	S-207	
	14.885	23.955	S-547	
	42.446	68.310	US 191 – Lewistown, Malta	Eastern terminus
1.000 mi = 1.609 km; 1.000 km = 0.621 mi
