= USS Shelton =

Two ships of the United States Navy have borne the name USS Shelton, named for Ensign James A. Shelton (1916–1942), who was killed in the Battle of Midway.

- USS Shelton (DE-407), was a John C. Butler-class destroyer escort, launched in 1943 and sunk in 1944.
- USS Shelton (DD-790), was a Gearing-class destroyer, launched in 1946 and struck in 1973. Sold to the Republic of China, she served as ROCS Lao Yang (DD-20) until she was decommissioned in 1999.
