= Dry Wolf Creek =

River in the United States of America

Location
- Country: Judith Basin County, Montana

Physical characteristics
- Source
  - coordinates: 46°56′35″N 110°36′59″W
- Mouth
  - coordinates: 47°06′32″N 110°17′48″W
  - elevation: 4,567 feet (1,392 m)

Basin features
- River system: Missouri River

Dry Wolf Creek is a tributary of the Judith River, approximately 40 mi (65 km) long, in central Montana in the United States.

It rises in the Lewis and Clark National Forest, near Big Baldy in the Little Belt Mountains, in western Judith Basin County. It flows northwest, past Stanford and Denton, then NNE to join the Judith in the White Cliffs Area in northern Fergus County.

== See also ==
- List of rivers of Montana
- Montana Stream Access Law
