= Surprise Creek Colony, Montana =

- Census-designated place
- Location within Montana Location within the United States
- Coordinates: 47°10′14″N 110°20′23″W
- Country: United States
- State: Montana
- County: Judith Basin

Area
  - Total: 0.15 sq mi (0.40 km^{2})
  - Land: 0.15 sq mi (0.40 km^{2})
  - Water: 0 sq mi (0.00 km^{2})
- Elevation: 4,285 ft (1,306 m)

Population (2020)
  - Total: 8
  - Density: 52.2/sq mi (20.16/km^{2})
- Time zone: UTC-7 (Mountain (MST))
  - Summer (DST): UTC-6 (MDT)
- ZIP Codes: 59479 (Stanford); 59447 (Geyser)
- Area code: 406
- FIPS code: 30-72660
- GNIS feature ID: 2806633

Surprise Creek Colony is a Hutterite community and census-designated place (CDP) in Judith Basin County, Montana, United States. It is in the north-central part of the county, in the valley of Surprise Creek, a north-flowing tributary of Arrow Creek, which continues northeast to the Missouri River.

As of the 2020 census, Surprise Creek Colony had a population of 8.

U.S. Route 87/Montana Routes 200/3 passes less than a mile north of the colony, leading southeast 5 miles (8 km) to Stanford, the county seat, and northwest 10 miles (16 km) to Geyser. Great Falls is 56 miles (90 km) to the northwest.

Surprise Creek Colony was first listed as a CDP prior to the 2020 census.

== Demographics ==
Historical population
Census	Pop.	Note	%±
2020	8		—
U.S. Decennial Census
