= William W. Galt =

William W. Galt may refer to:

- William Wylie Galt (1919–1944), United States Army officer and Medal of Honor recipient
- William W. Galt (politician) (1854–1945), American farmer and politician in Minnesota
