= William Wylie Galt =

American soldier

- Born: December 19, 1919; Geyser, Judith Basin County, Montana, US
- Died: May 29, 1944 (aged 24); Villa Crocetta, Italy
- Burial place: Mount Olivet Cemetery, Great Falls, Montana
- Military career
- Allegiance: United States
- Branch: United States Army
- Service years: 1942 – 1944
- Rank: Captain
- Units: 1st Battalion, 168th Infantry Regiment, 34th Infantry Division
- Conflicts: World War II
- Awards: Medal of Honor, Silver Star

William Wylie Galt (December 19, 1919 – May 29, 1944) was a United States Army officer and a recipient of the United States military's highest decoration—the Medal of Honor—for his actions in World War II.

== Biography ==
Galt was a native of Geyser in Judith Basin County, Montana. After serving in ROTC at Montana State College, now Montana State University, he joined the Army from Stanford, Montana in June 1942. He married Patricia Ann Sandbo on July 24, 1942.

He was wounded while serving in North Africa in 1943 and again at Monte Cassino on January 27, 1944. It only kept him sidelined for a three weeks. In March his unit was sent to Anzio. By May 29, 1944 was serving as a captain and operations officer (S3) of the 1st Battalion, 168th Infantry Regiment, 34th Infantry Division. On that day, at Villa Crocetta, Italy, he personally commanded an attack against German positions. He manned a machine gun on a tank destroyer at the front of the assault force, staying at his post in the vehicle's turret and continuing to lead his men despite intense hostile fire. He was killed while still manning his machine gun and, on February 1, 1945, was posthumously awarded the Medal of Honor. Galt, aged 24 at his death, was buried in Mount Olivet Cemetery, Great Falls, Montana.

== Medal of Honor citation ==
Captain Galt's official Medal of Honor citation reads:

For conspicuous gallantry and intrepidity above and beyond the call of duty. Capt. Galt, Battalion S3, at a particularly critical period following 2 unsuccessful attacks by his battalion, of his own volition went forward and ascertained just how critical the situation was. He volunteered, at the risk of his life, personally to lead the battalion against the objective. When the lone remaining tank destroyer refused to go forward, Capt. Galt jumped on the tank destroyer and ordered it to precede the attack. As the tank destroyer moved forward, followed by a company of riflemen, Capt. Galt manned the .30-caliber machinegun in the turret of the tank destroyer, located and directed fire on an enemy 77mm. anti-tank gun, and destroyed it. Nearing the enemy positions, Capt. Galt stood fully exposed in the turret, ceaselessly firing his machinegun and tossing hand grenades into the enemy zigzag series of trenches despite the hail of sniper and machinegun bullets ricocheting off the tank destroyer. As the tank destroyer moved, Capt. Galt so maneuvered it that 40 of the enemy were trapped in one trench. When they refused to surrender, Capt. Galt pressed the trigger of the machinegun and dispatched every one of them. A few minutes later an 88mm shell struck the tank destroyer and Capt. Galt fell mortally wounded across his machinegun. He had personally killed 40 Germans and wounded many more. Capt. Galt pitted his judgment and superb courage against overwhelming odds, exemplifying the highest measure of devotion to his country and the finest traditions of the U.S. Army.

== See also ==
- List of Medal of Honor recipients
- List of Medal of Honor recipients for World War II
