= Gault (disambiguation) =

Gault is a clay formation around the south-east of England.

Gault may also refer to:

- Gault (surname), real and fictional people
- 6478 Gault, an asteroid
- Gault (archaeological site), a pre-Clovis archaeological site in Texas
- Gault Millau, a series of restaurant guides
- Gault Wood, a woodland in Cambridgeshire, England
- In re Gault, a 1967 US Supreme Court ruling establishing juveniles' rights in court

== See also ==
- Galt (disambiguation)
