= Sapphire Ridge, Montana =

- Census-designated place
- Location within Montana Location within the United States
- Coordinates: 46°53′11″N 110°15′00″W
- Country: United States
- State: Montana
- County: Judith Basin

Area
  - Total: 0.54 sq mi (1.40 km^{2})
  - Land: 0.54 sq mi (1.40 km^{2})
  - Water: 0 sq mi (0.00 km^{2})
- Elevation: 4,892 ft (1,491 m)

Population (2020)
  - Total: 26
  - Density: 48.1/sq mi (18.58/km^{2})
- Time zone: UTC-7 (Mountain (MST))
  - Summer (DST): UTC-6 (MDT)
- ZIP Code: 59452 (Hobson)
- Area code: 406
- FIPS code: 30-66317
- GNIS feature ID: 2806632

Sapphire Ridge is a census-designated place (CDP) in Judith Basin County, Montana, United States. As of the 2020 census, Sapphire Ridge had a population of 26. The community is more commonly known as Sapphire Village. It is in the southern part of the county, on the west side of the valley of the Judith River, a northeast-flowing tributary of the Missouri River.

Pigeye Road is the main route out of the community, leading northeast 10 miles (16 km) down the Judith River valley to Utica. To the southwest the road leads into the Little Belt Mountains and Lewis and Clark National Forest.

Sapphire Ridge was first listed as a CDP prior to the 2020 census.

== Demographics ==
Historical population
Census	Pop.	Note	%±
2020	26		—
U.S. Decennial Census

== Climate ==
Lewistown 42 WSW is a weather station located near Sapphire Village. Lewistown 42 WSW has a humid continental climate (Köppen Dfb), bordering on a subalpine climate (Köppen Dfc).

Climate data for Lewistown 42 WSW, Montana, 1991–2020 normals, 2008-2023 extremes: 5070ft (1545m)
Month	Jan	Feb	Mar	Apr	May	Jun	Jul	Aug	Sep	Oct	Nov	Dec	Year
Record high °F (°C)	67 (19)	65 (18)	70 (21)	80 (27)	82 (28)	95 (35)	95 (35)	96 (36)	96 (36)	85 (29)	71 (22)	64 (18)	96 (36)
Mean maximum °F (°C)	54.0 (12.2)	52.6 (11.4)	61.2 (16.2)	71.1 (21.7)	76.4 (24.7)	85.0 (29.4)	89.8 (32.1)	91.1 (32.8)	86.9 (30.5)	75.3 (24.1)	63.5 (17.5)	53.6 (12.0)	92.2 (33.4)
Mean daily maximum °F (°C)	36.5 (2.5)	35.8 (2.1)	43.5 (6.4)	49.8 (9.9)	59.5 (15.3)	67.4 (19.7)	77.5 (25.3)	77.3 (25.2)	68.5 (20.3)	53.3 (11.8)	42.1 (5.6)	34.7 (1.5)	53.8 (12.1)
Daily mean °F (°C)	24.9 (−3.9)	24.0 (−4.4)	31.5 (−0.3)	37.3 (2.9)	46.3 (7.9)	53.7 (12.1)	60.9 (16.1)	60.6 (15.9)	52.2 (11.2)	40.6 (4.8)	31.2 (−0.4)	24.0 (−4.4)	40.6 (4.8)
Mean daily minimum °F (°C)	13.3 (−10.4)	12.1 (−11.1)	19.6 (−6.9)	24.7 (−4.1)	33.0 (0.6)	40.0 (4.4)	44.3 (6.8)	43.8 (6.6)	36.0 (2.2)	27.8 (−2.3)	20.4 (−6.4)	13.3 (−10.4)	27.4 (−2.6)
Mean minimum °F (°C)	−18.7 (−28.2)	−19.3 (−28.5)	−7.3 (−21.8)	6.8 (−14.0)	18.5 (−7.5)	29.5 (−1.4)	34.6 (1.4)	31.9 (−0.1)	22.9 (−5.1)	5.8 (−14.6)	−5.9 (−21.1)	−18.0 (−27.8)	−28.8 (−33.8)
Record low °F (°C)	−32 (−36)	−39 (−39)	−39 (−39)	−9 (−23)	10 (−12)	24 (−4)	30 (−1)	23 (−5)	8 (−13)	−15 (−26)	−21 (−29)	−41 (−41)	−41 (−41)
Average precipitation inches (mm)	0.61 (15)	0.82 (21)	0.86 (22)	1.60 (41)	2.83 (72)	3.07 (78)	1.70 (43)	1.40 (36)	1.34 (34)	1.33 (34)	0.65 (17)	0.55 (14)	16.76 (427)
Average precipitation days (≥ 0.01 in)	8.5	10.3	9.5	13.3	15.2	12.3	9.4	9.0	7.1	8.8	7.7	9.3	120.4
Source 1: NOAA
Source 2: XMACIS2 (temp records & 2008-2023 monthly max/mins)
