= Stanford Airport =

- IATA: none; ICAO: none; FAA LID: S64

Summary
- Airport type: Public
- Owner: Judith Basin County
- Serves: Stanford, Montana
- Elevation AMSL: 4,327 ft / 1,319 m
- Coordinates: 47°08′48″N 110°13′48″W

Map
- Location of airport in Montana

Runways
Direction	Length		Surface
Direction	ft	m	Surface
11/29	4,200	1,280	Asphalt
7/25	1,760	536	Turf

Statistics (2011)
- Aircraft operations: 4,300
- Based aircraft: 10
- Source: Federal Aviation Administration

Stanford Airport (Biggerstaff Field) (FAA LID: S64) is a county-owned, public-use airport located one nautical mile (2 km) south of the central business district of Stanford, Judith Basin County, Montana. It is included in the National Plan of Integrated Airport Systems for 2011–2015, which categorized it as a general aviation facility.

== Facilities and aircraft ==
Stanford Airport covers an area of 133 acres (54 ha) at an elevation of 4,327 feet (1,319 m) above mean sea level. It has two runways: 11/29 is 4,200 by 75 feet (1,280 x 23 m) with an asphalt surface and 7/25 is 1,760 by 100 feet (536 x 30 m) with a turf surface.

For the 12-month period ending July 19, 2011, the airport had 4,300 general aviation aircraft operations, an average of 11 per day. At that time there were 10 single-engine aircraft based at this airport.

== See also ==
- List of airports in Montana
