= Galt =

Galt or GALT may refer to:

== Biology and biochemistry ==
- Galactose-1-phosphate uridylyltransferase, an enzyme
- Gut-associated lymphoid tissue, a subset of mucosa-associated lymphoid tissue

== People and fictional characters ==
- Galt (surname), a list of people and fictional characters
- Christopher Galt, a pseudonym of Craig Russell (British author)
- Walter Galt, a pen name of Talbot Mundy, born William Lancaster Gribbon (1879–1940)
- Galt MacDermot (1928–2018), Canadian-American composer, pianist and writer of musical theatre

== Places ==
=== United States ===
- Galt, California, a city
- Galt Island (Florida)
- Galt, Illinois, an unincorporated community
- Galt, Iowa, a city
- Galt, Kansas, a ghost town
- Galt, Michigan, a settlement
- Galt, Missouri, a city

=== Elsewhere ===
- Galt, Ontario, Canada, now part of Cambridge
- Galt Historic Railway Park, Alberta, Canada
- Galt, Khövsgöl, Mongolia, a sum (district)

== Other uses ==
- HMCS Galt (K163), a Royal Canadian Navy corvette
- Galt Toys, a British toy and game manufacturer
- Galt High School, Galt, California
- Galt Museum & Archives, Lethbridge, Alberta, Canada

== See also ==
- Gault (disambiguation)
