= Central Montana Rail, Inc. =

Class III Railroad in Montana

Central Montana Rail
Overview
- Headquarters: Denton, Montana
- Reporting mark: CM
- Locale: Montana, United States
- Dates of operation: 1985–

Technical
- Track gauge: 4 ft 8 1/2 in (1,435 mm) standard gauge

Central Montana Rail, Inc. (reporting mark CM), is a short line railroad operating trackage in Judith Basin, Fergus, and Chouteau counties, Montana. The company's main line extends approximately 84.2 miles (135.5 km), between the towns of Moccasin and Geraldine; the line connects with the BNSF Railway at Moccasin.

Most of the current Central Montana trackage was originally constructed by the Chicago, Milwaukee, St. Paul and Pacific Railroad, as part of its "Northern Montana" line to Great Falls. The southern 19.6 miles (31.5 km) of line, from Moccasin to Kingston Junction, was originally constructed by the Great Northern Railway as part of its Lewistown, Montana, branch. The overall line features four high steel trestles and a 2,000-foot (610 m)-long tunnel. In addition to the operated line, the Central Montana system includes an unused route between Spring Creek Junction and the northern outskirts of Lewistown; this trackage has been idle since the 1980s due to perceived structural problems with the massive Spring Creek Trestle, just east of Spring Creek Junction.

Most of the Central Montana trackage was acquired by the state of Montana in 1983 when its then-current operator, the Burlington Northern Railroad, discontinued operation of the route. Central Montana Rail, a locally governed nonprofit corporation, began operating the route in 1985. The company's motive power consists of six EMD GP9 diesel-electric locomotives, originally built for the Great Northern Railway and one GP30, originally built for Union Pacific. The railroad's operating headquarters is at Denton, Montana.

Though primarily a freight railroad, the Central Montana also operates a seasonal dinner train, the "Charlie Russell Chew Choo," between Kingston Junction (10 miles north west of Lewistown) and Denton. The dinner train equipment consists of unpowered Budd Rail Diesel Cars originally built for the Boston and Maine Railroad. In December, the Chew Choo operates several "Polar Express" runs, which boards at Kingston Junction and takes kids to "Christmas Town" at the north Pole to pick up Santa, who rides the train back to Kingston Junction. On the train, elves read the book and serve hot cocoa and cookies to the kids. Round trip is approx. 1.5–2 hours.

== Popular culture ==
The climax of Broken Arrow (1996) was filmed on the CMR in Fergus County between Lewistown, Montana; and Denton, Montana.
