= Annabel Galt =

American missionary and educator (1868–1938)

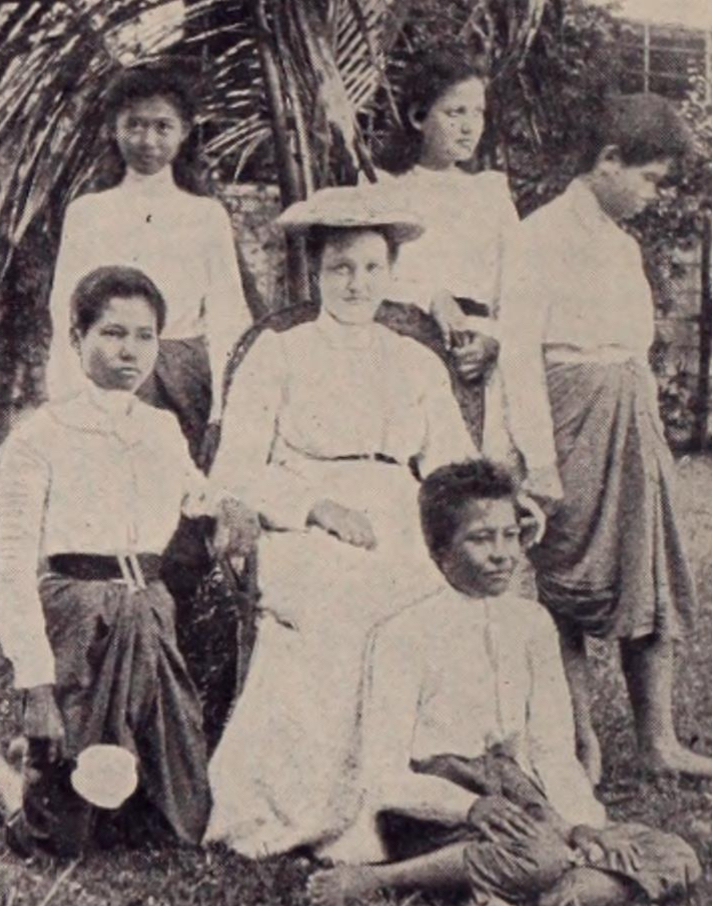
- Galt with some of her students, from a 1914 publication
- Born: May 10, 1868; Sangamon County, Illinois, U.S.
- Died: October 3, 1938 (aged 70); Orlando, Florida, U.S.
- Other names: Annabelle Galt
- Occupation(s): Educator, Christian missionary
- Years active: 1891-1934
- Known for: Missionary teacher in Thailand
- Relatives: Thomas Galt (grandfather)

Annabel Galt (May 10, 1868 – October 3, 1938) was an American missionary teacher who worked in Thailand from 1891 to 1934, and taught at Bangkok Christian College.

== Early life and education ==
Galt was born in Sangamon County, Illinois, the daughter of John Galt and Margaret Ann Epler Galt. Abolitionist minister Thomas Galt was her grandfather. She graduated from Springfield Teachers Training School.

== Career ==
Galt taught school in Illinois as a young woman. She and her cousin Margaret Galt became Presbyterian missionary teachers in Siam in 1891. She taught for eight years in Phetchaburi and at Howard Memorial School for Girls. At Phetchaburi she and Margaret worked with Margaret's eventual husband, Charles Eckels. An American visitor in 1898 described Galt as riding a bicycle in her work at Phetchaburi. "Down at Sumray, Miss Galt had surrounded herself with seven small boys who have been specially committed to her charge," reported a 1903 visitor. "They eat at her table, she teaches them manners, morals, watches over their health and studies, protects, in short mothers them."

Galt became an English instructor at the Bangkok Christian College. She edited and compiled several textbooks, taught Bible and music classes, served as acting principal and mentored women's organizations at the school. Galt wrote about her work for American publications, and spoke to American church groups about her work overseas during her furloughs in the United States in 1899, 1907, and 1927. She retired from missionary work in 1934.

== Personal life and legacy ==
Galt lived with her sister Carrie Lindtwed in Pennsylvania in her later years. She died in 1938, at the age of 70, while staying with another sister, Ella, in Orlando, Florida. Two of Galt's Thai students visit Lindtwed in 1940, while they were in the United States for college. Galt's photo appears among those of other figures in the history of Bangkok Christian College, on the school's website marking its 150th anniversary.
