= Windham, Montana =

- Census-designated place
- Location within Montana Location within the United States
- Coordinates: 47°04′41″N 110°08′19″W
- Country: United States
- State: Montana
- County: Judith Basin

Area
  - Total: 0.42 sq mi (1.08 km^{2})
  - Land: 0.42 sq mi (1.08 km^{2})
  - Water: 0 sq mi (0.00 km^{2})
- Elevation: 4,264 ft (1,300 m)

Population (2020)
  - Total: 43
  - Density: 103.5/sq mi (39.95/km^{2})
- Time zone: UTC-7 (Mountain (MST))
  - Summer (DST): UTC-6 (MDT)
- ZIP Code: 59479 (Stanford)
- Area code: 406
- FIPS code: 30-80950
- GNIS feature ID: 2806635

Windham is a census-designated place (CDP) in Judith Basin County, Montana, United States. It is in the center of the county along U.S. Route 87, Montana Highway 200 and 3. The town is 6 miles (10 km) southeast of Stanford, the county seat, and 38 miles (61 km) west of Lewistown. As of the 2020 census, Windham had a population of 43.

Windham is in the valley of Sage Creek, a northeast-flowing tributary of the Judith River, which continues north to the Missouri River.

The community was first listed as a CDP prior to the 2020 census.

The Judith Basin Press is the local newspaper. It is published weekly.

== Demographics ==
Historical population
Census	Pop.	Note	%±
2020	43		—
U.S. Decennial Census
