= Judith Gap, Montana =

City in Wheatland County, Montana, United States

Judith Gap
- City
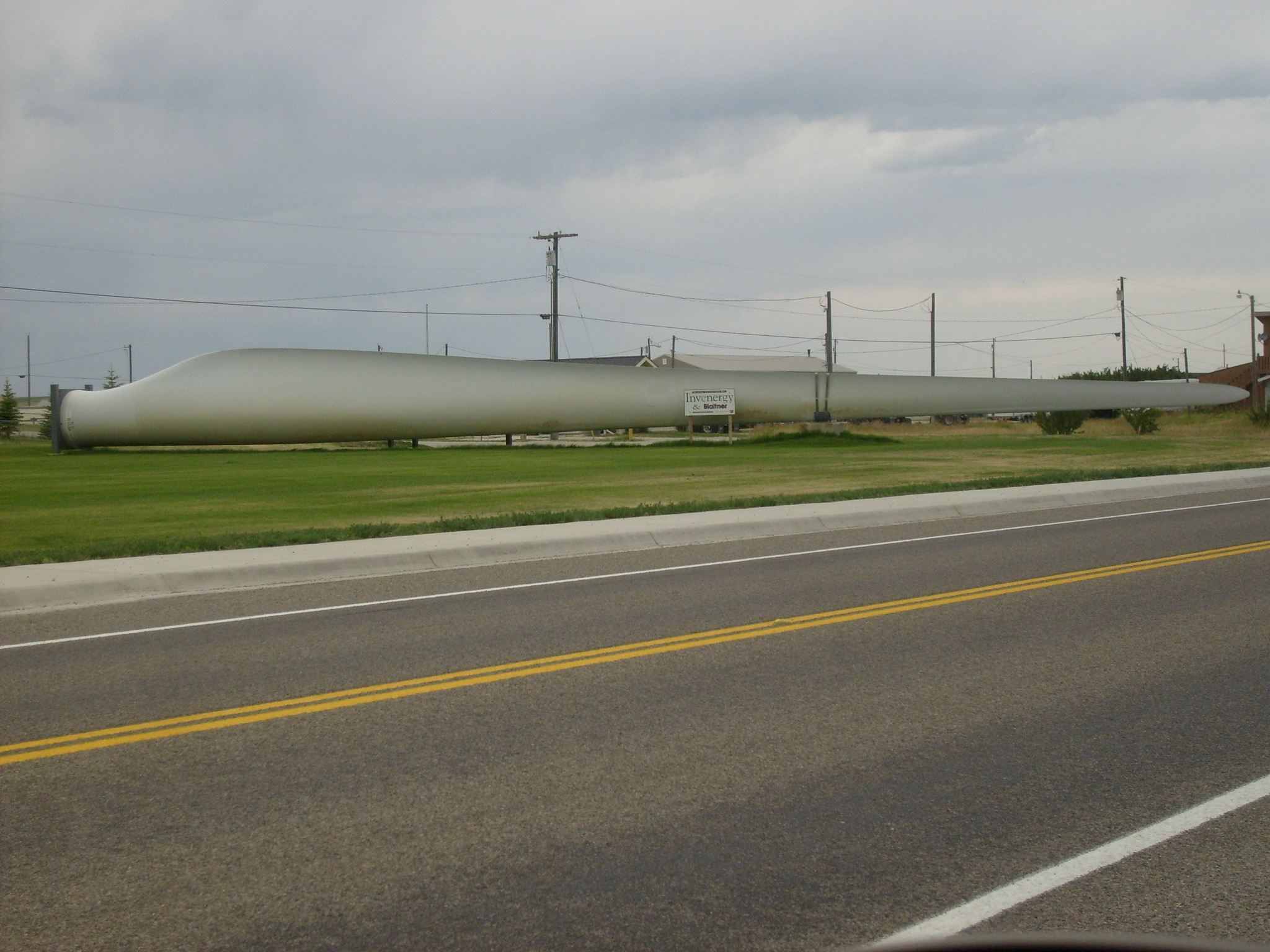
- City Center Park, Judith Gap

- Location of Judith Gap, Montana
- Coordinates: 46°40′39″N 109°45′02″W
- Country: United States
- State: Montana
- County: Wheatland

Area
  - Total: 0.33 sq mi (0.86 km^{2})
  - Land: 0.33 sq mi (0.86 km^{2})
  - Water: 0 sq mi (0.00 km^{2})
- Elevation: 4,643 ft (1,415 m)

Population (2020)
  - Total: 110
  - Density: 330.9/sq mi (127.77/km^{2})
- Time zone: UTC-7 (Mountain (MST))
  - Summer (DST): UTC-6 (MDT)
- ZIP code: 59453
- Area code: 406
- FIPS code: 30-40000
- GNIS feature ID: 2410154

Judith Gap is a city in Wheatland County, Montana, United States. The population was 110 at the 2020 census.

== History ==
The railway station here was initially named "Ubet", after A. R. Barrows' nearby stage stop settlement Ubet, Montana. Judith Gap, like the river and mountains, derives its name from Capt. William Clark’s fiancée, Julia (Judith) Hancock.

Judith Gap’s economic prospects soared in 2005 with the construction of a major wind farm.

== Geography ==
The city is situated in the historic Judith Gap, which is a small gap between the two towering mountain ranges (the Big Snowy Mountains and Little Belt Mountains) that separate Central Montana from Southern Montana. This gap has been used by settlers and Native Americans for centuries, including Chief Joseph and the Nez Perce during their famous 1877 flight to Canada.

According to the United States Census Bureau, the city has a total area of 0.38 square miles (0.98 km^{2}), all land.

== Demographics ==
Historical population
Census	Pop.	Note	%±
1920	522		—
1930	288		−44.8%
1940	212		−26.4%
1950	175		−17.5%
1960	185		5.7%
1970	160		−13.5%
1980	213		33.1%
1990	133		−37.6%
2000	164		23.3%
2010	126		−23.2%
2020	110		−12.7%
U.S. Decennial Census

=== 2010 census ===
As of the census of 2010, there were 126 people, 64 households, and 34 families residing in the city. The population density was 331.6 inhabitants per square mile (128.0/km^{2}). There were 83 housing units at an average density of 218.4 per square mile (84.3/km^{2}). The racial makeup of the city was 96.0% White, 0.8% African American, 2.4% Asian, and 0.8% from two or more races.

There were 64 households, of which 12.5% had children under the age of 18 living with them, 46.9% were married couples living together, 4.7% had a female householder with no husband present, 1.6% had a male householder with no wife present, and 46.9% were non-families. 42.2% of all households were made up of individuals, and 9.4% had someone living alone who was 65 years of age or older. The average household size was 1.97 and the average family size was 2.65.

The median age in the city was 58 years. 10.3% of residents were under the age of 18; 9.6% were between the ages of 18 and 24; 15.1% were from 25 to 44; 38.9% were from 45 to 64; and 26.2% were 65 years of age or older. The gender makeup of the city was 52.4% male and 47.6% female.

=== 2000 census ===
As of the census of 2000, there were 164 people, 69 households, and 48 families residing in the city. The population density was 440.9 inhabitants per square mile (170.2/km^{2}). There were 94 housing units at an average density of 252.7 per square mile (97.6/km^{2}). The racial makeup of the city was 91.46% White, 1.22% African American, 1.22% Native American, 0.61% Asian, and 5.49% from two or more races.

There were 69 households, out of which 34.8% had children under the age of 18 living with them, 49.3% were married couples living together, 7.2% had a female householder with no husband present, and 30.4% were non-families. 30.4% of all households were made up of individuals, and 11.6% had someone living alone who was 65 years of age or older. The average household size was 2.38 and the average family size was 2.83.

In the city, the population was spread out, with 30.5% under the age of 18, 5.5% from 18 to 24, 21.3% from 25 to 44, 31.7% from 45 to 64, and 11.0% who were 65 years of age or older. The median age was 40 years. For every 100 females there were 121.6 males. For every 100 females age 18 and over, there were 115.1 males.

The median income for a household in the city was $16,979, and the median income for a family was $17,292. Males had a median income of $25,625 versus $11,250 for females. The per capita income for the city was $8,927. About 33.3% of families and 37.3% of the population were below the poverty line, including 65.7% of those under the age of eighteen and none of those 65 or over.

== Climate ==
The Köppen Climate System classifies the weather as humid continental, abbreviated as Dfb.

Climate data for Judith Gap, Montana, 1991–2020 normals, extremes 1952–present
Month	Jan	Feb	Mar	Apr	May	Jun	Jul	Aug	Sep	Oct	Nov	Dec	Year
Record high °F (°C)	66 (19)	65 (18)	74 (23)	80 (27)	87 (31)	95 (35)	104 (40)	99 (37)	94 (34)	82 (28)	75 (24)	64 (18)	104 (40)
Mean maximum °F (°C)	52.4 (11.3)	54.3 (12.4)	62.7 (17.1)	72.3 (22.4)	78.2 (25.7)	84.5 (29.2)	90.2 (32.3)	90.4 (32.4)	86.6 (30.3)	77.0 (25.0)	63.6 (17.6)	53.2 (11.8)	92.3 (33.5)
Mean daily maximum °F (°C)	33.9 (1.1)	33.5 (0.8)	42.3 (5.7)	51.0 (10.6)	60.2 (15.7)	67.9 (19.9)	79.4 (26.3)	79.7 (26.5)	68.6 (20.3)	54.0 (12.2)	42.3 (5.7)	32.8 (0.4)	53.8 (12.1)
Daily mean °F (°C)	22.9 (−5.1)	23.3 (−4.8)	31.0 (−0.6)	39.2 (4.0)	47.9 (8.8)	55.7 (13.2)	64.7 (18.2)	64.1 (17.8)	54.4 (12.4)	41.7 (5.4)	31.6 (−0.2)	22.6 (−5.2)	41.6 (5.3)
Mean daily minimum °F (°C)	11.9 (−11.2)	13.0 (−10.6)	19.8 (−6.8)	27.3 (−2.6)	35.6 (2.0)	43.6 (6.4)	50.0 (10.0)	48.6 (9.2)	40.2 (4.6)	29.5 (−1.4)	20.8 (−6.2)	12.4 (−10.9)	29.4 (−1.5)
Mean minimum °F (°C)	−12.3 (−24.6)	−10.1 (−23.4)	−2.9 (−19.4)	10.3 (−12.1)	21.8 (−5.7)	31.6 (−0.2)	39.3 (4.1)	37.3 (2.9)	26.6 (−3.0)	11.8 (−11.2)	−2.1 (−18.9)	−11.4 (−24.1)	−22.0 (−30.0)
Record low °F (°C)	−25 (−32)	−29 (−34)	−25 (−32)	1 (−17)	14 (−10)	24 (−4)	31 (−1)	21 (−6)	15 (−9)	−9 (−23)	−16 (−27)	−27 (−33)	−29 (−34)
Average precipitation inches (mm)	0.43 (11)	0.45 (11)	0.64 (16)	1.75 (44)	3.26 (83)	3.03 (77)	1.73 (44)	1.49 (38)	1.36 (35)	0.89 (23)	0.51 (13)	0.38 (9.7)	15.92 (404.7)
Average snowfall inches (cm)	4.5 (11)	6.7 (17)	3.6 (9.1)	2.8 (7.1)	0.4 (1.0)	0.0 (0.0)	0.0 (0.0)	0.0 (0.0)	0.2 (0.51)	1.8 (4.6)	3.7 (9.4)	3.8 (9.7)	27.5 (69.41)
Average precipitation days (≥ 0.01 in)	2.9	2.9	3.9	7.8	10.3	10.1	7.9	6.9	5.3	4.9	2.8	2.7	68.4
Average snowy days (≥ 0.1 in)	2.0	2.7	1.4	1.1	0.4	0.0	0.0	0.0	0.1	1.0	1.4	1.7	11.8
Source 1: NOAA
Source 2: National Weather Service

== Judith Gap Wind Farm ==
The Judith Gap Wind Farm is located south of Judith Gap and has a nameplate capacity of 135 MW with 90 turbines. It was the first wind farm to be installed in Montana.

== Government ==
Jeff Miller won the election for mayor in November 2025.

== Education ==
Judith Gap School educates students from preschool through 12th grade. Their team name is the Tigers.

In 2023, Judith Gap joined with Harlowton and Ryegate to co-op for high school sports.

== See also ==
- List of municipalities in Montana
