= Ubet, Montana =

Human settlement in Montana, US

Ubet (also written U-Bet or U-bet) was a stage stop settlement in Fergus County, Montana (but what is now Judith Basin County), United States. It is approximately 3 mi (4.8 km) west of Garneill, which was reputedly the best-known stagecoach station in the Montana Territory.

== History ==
Ubet was founded in 1880 on the Ft. Benton–Billings stagecoach route by lumberman (and former Wisconsin State Assembly Speaker of the House) A. R. Barrows (who with his family was among the first permanent white settlers of the Judith Basin). The name supposedly came from Barrows' response to a challenge for a name for the settlement's proposed post office: "You bet!" At one time, it included not only a two-story log hotel, but a stagecoach barn, post office, icehouse, saloon, blacksmith shop, and a stable.

At one time, there were less than ten fixed human habitations between Ubet and Billings, making the respite there (including Mrs. Barrows' cooking) particularly treasured. Clientele included Liver-Eating Johnson and local cowboy Charlie Russell, who would become the first well-known "cowboy artist". After the advent of railroads in the area, the stage stop became less vital, and the settlement seems to have withered away (although the railroad stops at both Garneill and Judith Gap were initially named "Ubet" as well). In 1934, Barrows' son John (by then an attorney in San Diego, California) published a boyhood memoir titled, Ubet (1934; reprinted in 1990 as Ubet: A Greenhorn in Old Montana) which was reviewed in the New York Times as "dramatic and colorful."

As of the 1939 Montana: A State Guide Book by the Federal Writers' Project, only one or two log buildings remained, used in the earlier 1930s by sheepherders.

There is a Ubet Cemetery located on the Ubet Ranch (also called Ubet-Garneill Cemetery) still extant at longitude 46°44′50″ N latitude 109°46′33″W 46.747178.
