= Augustus Barrows =

19th century American politician

Augustus R. Barrows

28th Speaker of the Wisconsin State Assembly
- In office January 9, 1878 – January 6, 1879
- Preceded by: John B. Cassoday
- Succeeded by: David M. Kelly

Member of the Wisconsin State Assembly from the Chippewa district
- In office January 7, 1878 – January 6, 1879
- Preceded by: Louis Vincent
- Succeeded by: Hector McRae

3rd Mayor of Chippewa Falls, Wisconsin
- In office April 1872 – April 1873
- Preceded by: J. W. Sheldon
- Succeeded by: Jacob Leinenkugel

Personal details
- Born: July 30, 1838 Olean, New York, U.S.
- Died: December 20, 1885 (aged 47) Ubet, Montana Territory
- Resting place: Forest Hill Cemetery, Chippewa Falls, Wisconsin
- Party: Democratic; Greenback (1877–1879)
- Spouse: Alice B. Duncan (m. 1862)
- Occupation: lumberman, innkeeper, legislator

Military service
- Allegiance: United States
- Branch/service: United States Volunteers; Union Army
- Years of service: 1864–1865
- Rank: 2nd Lieutenant, USV
- Unit: 11th Reg. Min. Vol. Infantry
- Battles/wars: American Civil War

Augustus R. Barrows (July 30, 1838 – December 20, 1885) was an American lumberman, rancher, and pioneer settler of Minnesota, Wisconsin, and Montana. He served one term in the Wisconsin State Assembly as a member of the Greenback Party. He served as speaker of the Assembly during his term as part of a negotiated coalition with the Democratic caucus. He was the only Greenback legislator to serve as speaker of the Wisconsin State Assembly. He was also the 3rd mayor of Chippewa Falls, Wisconsin. In contemporaneous sources, his name is often abbreviated as A. R. Barrows.

== Background ==
Barrows was born in Olean, New York, on July 30, 1838; he studied at an academy (later renamed Chamberlain Institute) in Randolph, New York, where his father was a pioneering lumberman. Augustus assisted his father in his business until on one of their trips to Cincinnati on a raft, his father lost a leg in an accident. He closed out his business in New York and moved with his family to Pleasant Grove, Minnesota, in 1855, and went into farming. Augustus, who had accompanied his family to their new home, "followed various pursuits" for a while. He married Alice B. Duncan in Pleasant Grove on November 16, 1862.

In August 1864, Barrows volunteered for service in the American Civil War and was enrolled as a private in Company H of the 11th Minnesota Infantry Regiment. He was promoted to first sergeant a month later. He mustered out on June 30, 1865, and was granted an honorary commission as second lieutenant after the war.

On mustering out, he relocated to Wisconsin, settling in Chippewa County.

== Public office ==
Barrows was elected County Treasurer of Chippewa County in 1869 to fill a vacancy, and re-elected for a full term in 1870; and served one term as mayor of Chippewa Falls. In 1872, he ran for the Assembly as a Democrat, losing to incumbent Republican Albert Pound (who was also a lumberman from Chippewa Falls), with 676 votes to Pound's 1205. In 1876, he ran for the Wisconsin State Senate's Eleventh District (again as a Democrat), losing to incumbent Republican Thomas Scott with 3,700 votes to Scott's 3,925.

He became a vigorous adherent of the Greenback movement, becoming known as "one of its ablest and most logical advocates in the state". In 1877, he ran for Chippewa County's sole Assembly seat as an independent Greenback, unseating Democratic incumbent Louis Vincent, who polled only 496 votes to 886 votes for Barrows and 555 for Republican O. R. Dahl. He was chosen as speaker on January 9, 1878, because the Assembly now consisted of 45 Republicans, 41 Democrats, 13 Greenbacks and a socialist: thus, the Greenbacks and socialist had leverage as tie-breakers, since the two major parties held mere pluralities.

In 1879, rather than run for re-election, he ran for Congress under a fusion ticket as a Greenback/Democrat in the Eighth District, losing with 11,421 votes to 12,795 for Republican incumbent Thaddeus C. Pound (brother and partner of Albert Pound). He was succeeded in the Assembly by Republican former Assemblyman Hector McRae.

== Moving to Montana ==
After losing the Congressional election, Barrows (who had suffered financial reverses in the real estate which constituted most of his wealth) organized a group of colonists who arrived in Martinsdale, Montana (a train stop on the main line of the Milwaukee Road), in June 1879. He brought a herd of blooded cattle with him, and went into stockraising, which he pursued for the rest of his life. Soon after his arrival there, he and Edward P. Allis of Milwaukee partnered to build a large sawmill, and began the manufacture of lumber at Sawmill Gulch in what was then Meagher County, Montana. He homesteaded 160 acres in a place he called "Ubet", also known as "U-Bet" or "U-bet", in what was then Fergus County. He built a stage stop hotel, saloon and general store on the stagecoach route, and moved there himself in 1881, becoming (with his family) among the first permanent white settlers of the Judith Basin.

He died on December 20, 1885, in Ubet, and was buried back in Chippewa Falls in a Masonic ceremony (he was a Masonic Knight Templar). He left Alice with a family of young children, but she continued to operate the businesses with the aid of her children, eventually increasing the original homestead to an estate of 2,000 acres. The Barrows were the parents of four children: John R.; Mary, who died at two years of age; Olive; and Clarence H. John, who became a lawyer in San Diego, California, later wrote a memoir of his family's life there titled U-Bet: A Greenhorn in Old Montana (1934; reprinted in 1990) which was reviewed in The New York Times as "dramatic and colorful."

Wisconsin State Assembly
Preceded by John B. Cassoday	Speaker of the Wisconsin State Assembly; January 9, 1878 – January 6, 1879	Succeeded by David M. Kelly
Preceded by Louis Vincent	Member of the Wisconsin State Assembly from the Chippewa district January 7, 1878 – January 6, 1879	Succeeded by Hector McRae
Political offices
Preceded by J. W. Sheldon	Mayor of Chippewa Falls, Wisconsin	Succeeded by Jacob Leinenkugel
