= Moccasin, Montana =

- Census-designated place
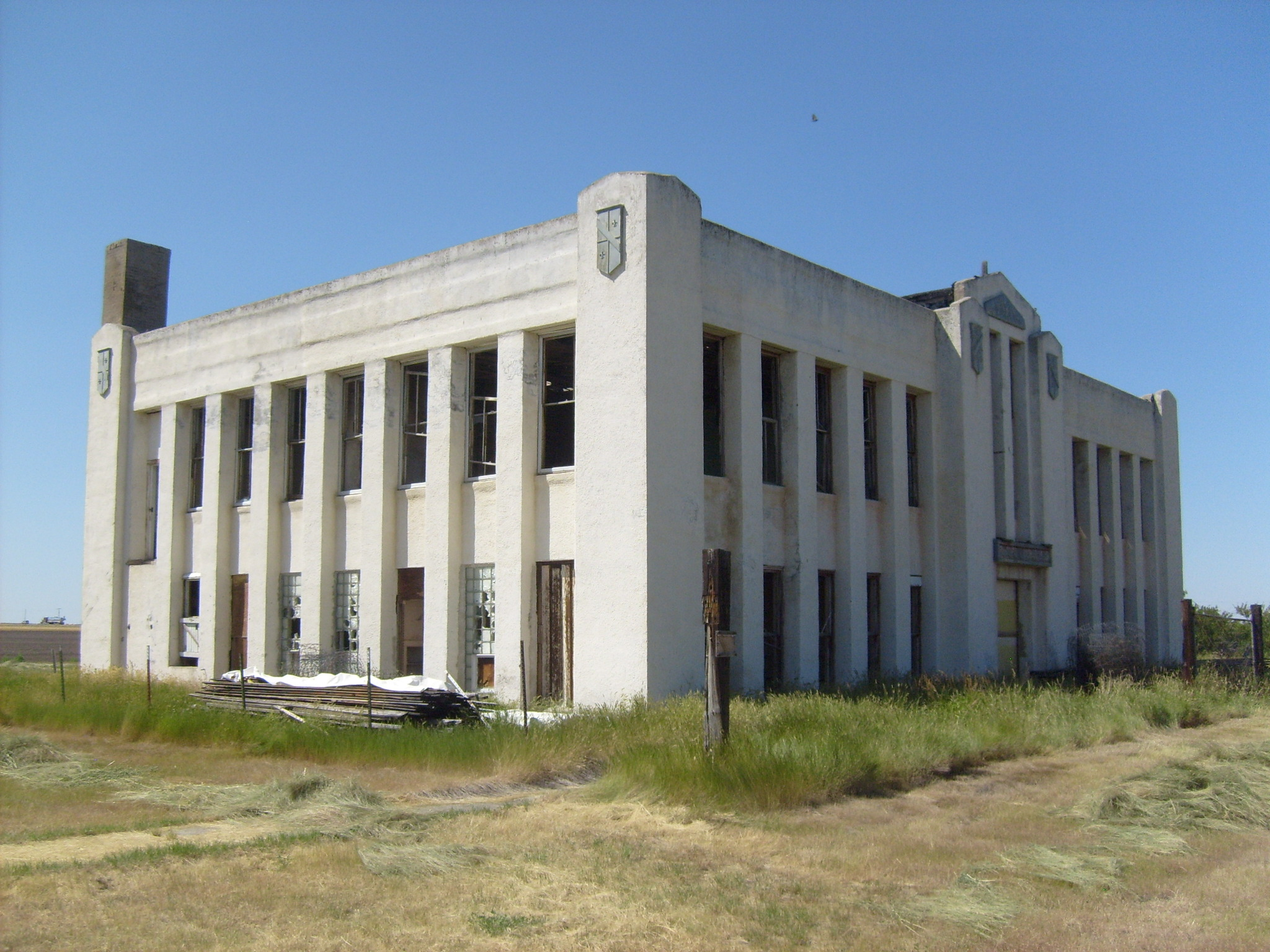
- Moccasin, Montana

- Location within Montana Location within the United States
- Coordinates: 47°03′10″N 109°54′31″W
- Country: United States
- State: Montana
- County: Judith Basin

Area
  - Total: 0.32 sq mi (0.82 km^{2})
  - Land: 0.32 sq mi (0.82 km^{2})
  - Water: 0 sq mi (0.00 km^{2})
- Elevation: 4,180 ft (1,270 m)

Population (2020)
  - Total: 23
  - Density: 72.6/sq mi (28.04/km^{2})
- Postal code: 59462
- ISO 3166 code: US-MT
- FIPS code: 30-50575
- GNIS feature ID: 2806630

Moccasin is an unincorporated community in Judith Basin County, Montana, United States. The community was named for the nearby Moccasin mountain range. Moccasin has a post office with the ZIP code 59462. As of the 2020 census, Moccasin had a population of 23.

Nearby Ackley Lake State Park is one of the few public lakes in Central Montana. It provides recreational activities, including fishing for several types of trout and kokanee salmon.

The Judith Basin Press is the local newspaper. It is published weekly.

== History ==
The name of the town is taken from a nearby mountain range called the Moccasin Mountain range. The name of the mountains come from the look with densely forested lodge pole pine trees; the Native Americans thought they looked like moccasins, thus giving the mountains and the town a name.

Moccasin has also been hit hard by devastating wildfires that struck the area in 1916, 1919, 1922, and 1955. The town never really recovered from the fires, which burned an entire block of buildings.

Moccasin began as a homestead community. A post office existed in the 1880s. D. O. Holt established a hotel and store here in 1905. In 1908 the Montana State legislature created the MSU Central Agricultural Research Center, three miles west of Moccasin. The purpose of the center was to teach dry land farming techniques to the newly arrived homesteaders. Even after the homesteaders bust, the center went on to develop machinery and new crops, improving the area's wheat yields.

== Climate ==
The Köppen Climate System classifies the weather as humid continental, abbreviated as Dfb.

Climate data for Moccasin Experimental Station, Montana, 1991–2020 normals, extremes 1909–present
Month	Jan	Feb	Mar	Apr	May	Jun	Jul	Aug	Sep	Oct	Nov	Dec	Year
Record high °F (°C)	72 (22)	74 (23)	77 (25)	87 (31)	93 (34)	101 (38)	102 (39)	103 (39)	98 (37)	91 (33)	79 (26)	72 (22)	103 (39)
Mean maximum °F (°C)	58.3 (14.6)	57.4 (14.1)	67.1 (19.5)	75.0 (23.9)	80.3 (26.8)	86.7 (30.4)	94.2 (34.6)	95.0 (35.0)	90.7 (32.6)	80.7 (27.1)	67.1 (19.5)	57.0 (13.9)	97.0 (36.1)
Mean daily maximum °F (°C)	36.9 (2.7)	37.6 (3.1)	45.3 (7.4)	53.3 (11.8)	62.4 (16.9)	70.7 (21.5)	81.7 (27.6)	81.8 (27.7)	70.9 (21.6)	57.4 (14.1)	45.0 (7.2)	37.1 (2.8)	56.7 (13.7)
Daily mean °F (°C)	24.9 (−3.9)	25.5 (−3.6)	32.7 (0.4)	40.6 (4.8)	49.8 (9.9)	57.7 (14.3)	66.0 (18.9)	65.8 (18.8)	56.2 (13.4)	44.0 (6.7)	32.9 (0.5)	25.3 (−3.7)	43.4 (6.4)
Mean daily minimum °F (°C)	12.9 (−10.6)	13.5 (−10.3)	20.2 (−6.6)	27.9 (−2.3)	37.2 (2.9)	44.8 (7.1)	50.3 (10.2)	49.7 (9.8)	41.4 (5.2)	30.5 (−0.8)	20.8 (−6.2)	13.5 (−10.3)	30.2 (−1.0)
Mean minimum °F (°C)	−13.4 (−25.2)	−9.8 (−23.2)	0.3 (−17.6)	12.6 (−10.8)	24.1 (−4.4)	34.2 (1.2)	40.3 (4.6)	39.4 (4.1)	28.3 (−2.1)	11.9 (−11.2)	−2.8 (−19.3)	−11.2 (−24.0)	−22.0 (−30.0)
Record low °F (°C)	−42 (−41)	−48 (−44)	−29 (−34)	−18 (−28)	2 (−17)	24 (−4)	31 (−1)	27 (−3)	4 (−16)	−19 (−28)	−32 (−36)	−41 (−41)	−48 (−44)
Average precipitation inches (mm)	0.46 (12)	0.38 (9.7)	0.64 (16)	1.43 (36)	2.64 (67)	2.74 (70)	1.63 (41)	1.68 (43)	1.48 (38)	1.12 (28)	0.52 (13)	0.42 (11)	15.14 (384.7)
Average snowfall inches (cm)	8.1 (21)	5.9 (15)	6.7 (17)	7.5 (19)	1.7 (4.3)	0.0 (0.0)	0.0 (0.0)	0.0 (0.0)	0.2 (0.51)	3.1 (7.9)	5.5 (14)	5.8 (15)	44.5 (113.71)
Average precipitation days (≥ 0.01 in)	5.7	5.6	7.1	10.4	12.8	12.3	8.9	8.6	7.3	7.8	6.1	6.4	99.0
Average snowy days (≥ 0.1 in)	4.9	5.1	5.2	4.0	1.0	0.0	0.0	0.0	0.2	1.9	4.4	5.3	32.0
Source 1: NOAA
Source 2: National Weather Service

== Demographics ==
Historical population
Census	Pop.	Note	%±
2020	23		—
U.S. Decennial Census
