= USS Shelton (DE-407) =

1943 destroyer escort

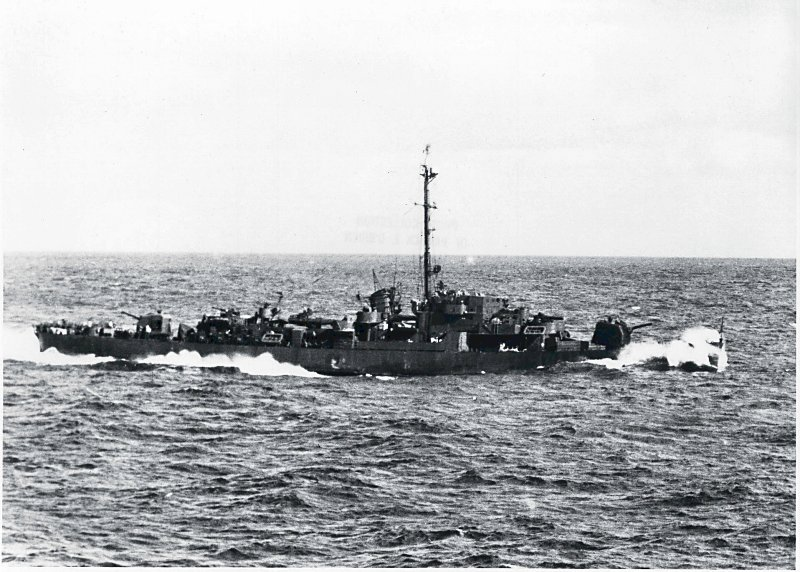
- An undated (c. 1944) wartime image of Shelton underway, exact date and location unknown.

History

United States
- Name: USS Shelton
- Namesake: James A. Shelton
- Builder: Brown Shipbuilding, Houston, Texas
- Laid down: 1 November 1943
- Launched: 18 December 1943
- Commissioned: 4 April 1944
- Stricken: 27 November 1944
- Fate: Sunk at 2°33′N 129°18′E by the submarine Ro-41, 3 October 1944

General characteristics
- Class & type: John C. Butler-class destroyer escort
- Displacement: 1,350 long tons (1,372 t)
- Length: 306 ft (93 m)
- Beam: 36 ft 8 in (11.18 m)
- Draft: 9 ft 5 in (2.87 m)
- Installed power: 12,000 shp (8,900 kW)
- Propulsion: 2 × geared steam turbines; 2 × boilers; 2 × shafts
- Speed: 24 kn (28 mph; 44 km/h)
- Range: 6,000 nmi (6,900 mi; 11,000 km) at 12 kn (14 mph; 22 km/h)
- Complement: 14 officers, 201 enlisted
- Armament: 2 × single 5 in (127 mm) guns; 2 × twin 40 mm (1.6 in) AA guns; 10 × single 20 mm (0.79 in) AA guns; 1 × triple 21 in (533 mm) torpedo tubes; 8 × depth charge throwers; 1 × Hedgehog ASW mortar; 2 × depth charge racks

USS Shelton (DE-407) was a John C. Butler-class destroyer escort built for the United States Navy during World War II. Named for Ensign James A. Shelton, (a naval aviator who was reported missing during the Battle of Midway), she was the first of two U.S. Naval vessels to bear the name.

Shelton's keel was laid down on 1 November 1943 by Brown Shipbuilding of Houston, Texas. The destroyer escort was launched on 18 December 1943, sponsored by Mrs. John Shelton, and commissioned on 4 April 1944. After fitting out and loading stores, Shelton steamed out of port on 21 April, in company with Edmonds bound for Bermuda on her shakedown cruise. Upon completion, she underwent post-shakedown availability at the Boston Navy Yard from 25 May – 15 June. She departed Boston on 16 June en route to San Diego via New York City, Hampton Roads, and Balboa, Panama Canal Zone.

== History ==
Shelton arrived at San Diego on 6 July and sailed for Pearl Harbor three days later. She stood out from Pearl Harbor on 26 July as part of a convoy proceeding to Eniwetok. The convoy arrived there on 6 August and was dissolved. Shelton was then assigned as a unit in the screen for Task Force 57 (TF 57) — composed of five carriers — and routed to Seeadler Harbor, Admiralty Island. After arriving there on 13 August, Shelton operated in the area until the following month when she was assigned to the Morotai Attack Force (TF 77). The DE was still off Morotai on 3 October in the screen for the escort carriers Fanshaw Bay and Midway when they were attacked by the Japanese submarine RO-41 at location 2°33′N 129°18′E. A torpedo wake was sighted at 1,500 yd (1,400 m) heading for the escort. In evading it, Shelton was hit on the starboard screw by a second torpedo, which caused severe damage and flooding. Fellow destroyer escort Richard M. Rowell came alongside and removed the crew. Shelton was taken under tow but capsized and sank. She was struck from the Naval Vessel Register on 27 November 1944.

== Honors ==
Shelton received one battle star for World War II service. Thirteen of her crew were lost with the ship and remain on duty.
