= Arrow Creek, Montana =

Unincorporated community in Montana, U.S.

Coordinates: 47°20′40″N 110°10′31″W

Arrow Creek is an unincorporated community in Judith Basin County, in the U.S. state of Montana. It is about 15 miles north of Stanford.

== History ==
A post office was established at Arrow Creek in 1914, and closed in 1920. The community took its name from nearby Arrow Creek.
