= Ackley Lake State Park =

State park in Montana, USA

- Location within Montana
- Location: Judith Basin County, Montana, United States
- Nearest city: Hobson, Montana
- Coordinates: 46°56′50″N 109°56′13″W
- Area: 290 acres (120 ha)
- Elevation: 4,337 ft (1,322 m)
- Designation: Montana state park
- Established: 1940
- Visitors: 27,428 (in 2023)
- Administrator: Montana Department of Fish, Wildlife and Parks
- Website: Ackley Lake State Park

Ackley Lake State Park is a public recreation area located four miles southwest of Hobson, Montana. The state park covers 290 acres (120 ha) centered around 160-acre (65 ha) Ackley Lake. The Little Belt Mountains and Snowy Mountains are visible on the horizon. The park is operated by the Montana Department of Fish, Wildlife and Parks on land leased from the Montana Department of Natural Resources and Conservation.

== History ==
The Ackley Lake was originally a 40-acre natural pond owned by Jean Acley. It became a reservoir in 1938 with the completion of an earthen embankment dam measuring 51 feet high and 3,514 feet long. The reservoir is an off-stream storage project with a supply canal from the Judith River. The site became Ackley State Park in 1940. It was threatened with the loss of its status as a state park after the Montana State Parks and Recreation Board adopted a five-year strategic plan, "Charting a New Tomorrow", that proposed a rebranding of the parks in its system. In 2017, the parks department renewed its lease with the Department of Natural Resources and Conservation for a further five years to the end 2021.

== Activities and amenities ==
The park offers stocked trout fishing, boating with two boat ramps, picnicking facilities, and a 26-site campground.

Fish species within the lake
| Species | Family | Class | Native to MT |
|---|---|---|---|
| Brook trout | Trout | Coldwater | Introduced |
| Brown trout | Trout | Coldwater | Introduced |
| Kokanee | Trout | Coldwater | Introduced |
| Longnose sucker | Sucker | Warmwater | Native |
| Mountain whitefish | Trout | Coldwater | Native |
| Rainbow trout | Trout | Coldwater | Introduced |
| White sucker | Sucker | Warmwater | Native |
