= USS Shelton (DD-790) =

Gearing-class destroyer

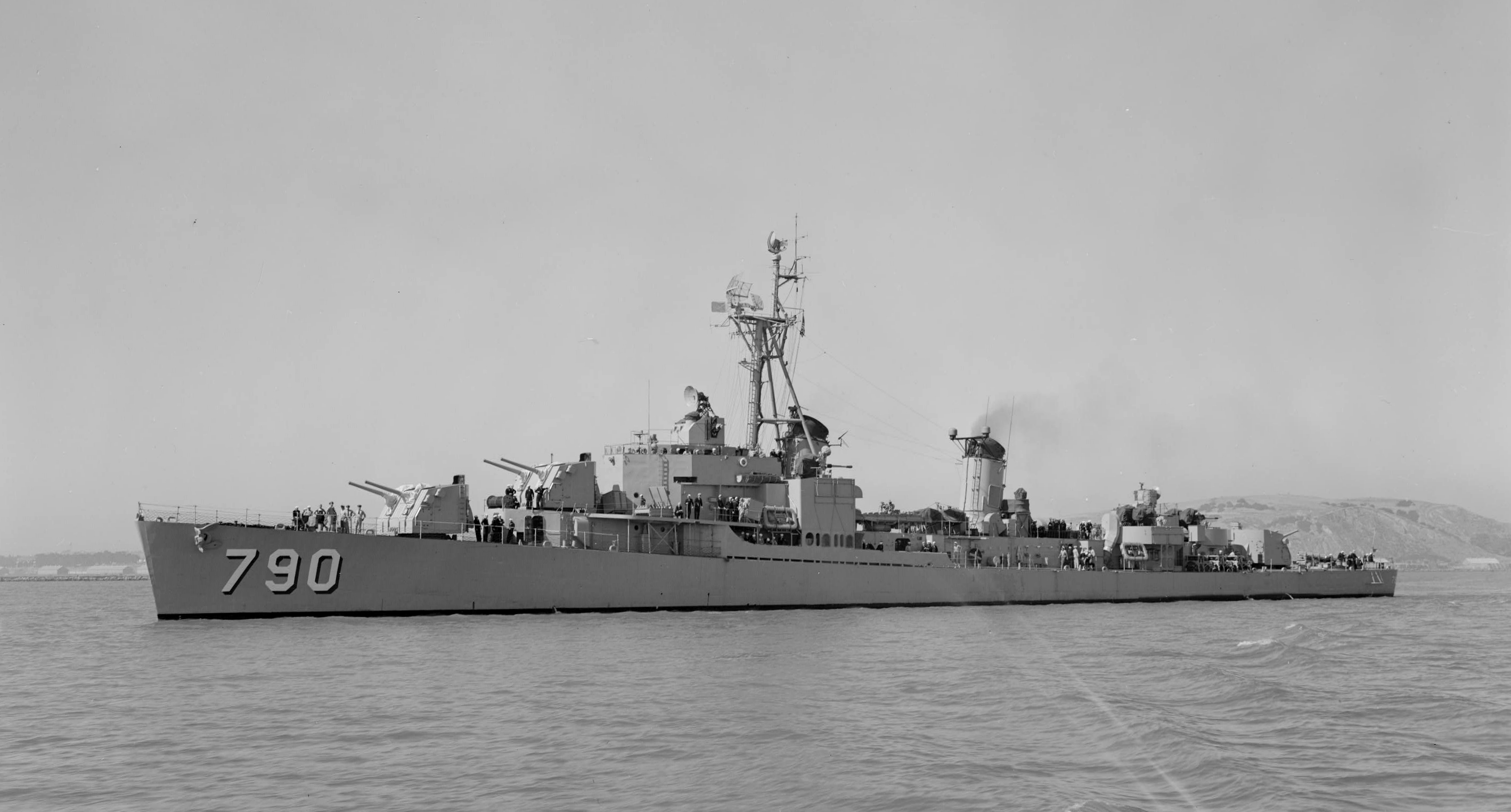
- USS Shelton on 6 July 1951

History

United States
- Name: Shelton
- Namesake: James A. Shelton
- Builder: Todd Pacific Shipyards
- Laid down: 31 May 1945
- Launched: 8 March 1946
- Sponsored by: Mrs. Loretta Shelton Miller
- Commissioned: 21 June 1946
- Modernized: June 1961 (FRAM IA)
- Stricken: 31 March 1973
- Identification: Callsign: NKRR; Hull number: DD-790
- Honors and awards: See Awards
- Fate: Sold to Taiwan, 18 April 1973
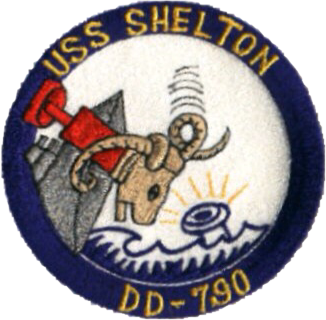
- Badge

History

Taiwan
- Name: Lai Yang; (萊陽)
- Namesake: Lai Yang
- Acquired: 18 April 1973
- Commissioned: 18 April 1973
- Reclassified: DD-920; DDG-920
- Decommissioned: 16 March 1999
- Identification: Hull number: DD-20
- Fate: Sunk as artificial reef, November 2002

General characteristics
- Class & type: Gearing-class destroyer
- Displacement: 3,460 long tons (3,516 t) full
- Length: 390 ft 6 in (119.02 m)
- Beam: 40 ft 10 in (12.45 m)
- Draft: 14 ft 4 in (4.37 m)
- Propulsion: Geared turbines, 2 shafts, 60,000 shp (45 MW)
- Speed: 35 knots (65 km/h; 40 mph)
- Range: 4,500 nmi (8,300 km) at 20 kn (37 km/h; 23 mph)
- Complement: 336
- Armament: 6 × 5"/38 caliber guns; 12 × 40 mm AA guns; 11 × 20 mm AA guns; 10 × 21 inch (533 mm) torpedo tubes; 6 × depth charge projectors; 2 × depth charge tracks

USS Shelton (DD-790) was a Gearing-class destroyer of the United States Navy, the second Navy ship named for Ensign James A. Shelton (1916–1942), who was killed in the Battle of Midway.

== Construction ==
Shelton was laid down on 31 May 1945 by Todd Pacific Shipyards Inc., Seattle, Washington; launched on 8 March 1946; sponsored by Mrs. Loretta Shelton Miller; and commissioned on 21 June 1946.

== United States Navy service ==
Shelton began her shakedown cruise on 20 July and returned to Seattle for post-shakedown availability. She moved down the coast to San Diego, California, on 12 October, and on 9 November stood out of that port en route to the western Pacific for her first tour of duty with the 7th Fleet. While serving with that fleet, she visited ports in China, Korea, and Japan. The destroyer returned to the west coast on 22 June 1947 and conducted local operations in the San Diego area. The destroyer underwent overhaul at the Puget Sound Naval Shipyard, Bremerton, Washington, from January to April 1948. After moving to San Diego on 19 April, Shelton operated along the California coast until sailing for WestPac and the 7th Fleet on 1 September. The seven-month deployment ended on 24 April 1949 when she sailed back into San Diego.

In June Shelton participated in a Midshipman training cruise which took her to Balboa, C.Z., and terminated in San Francisco at the end of July. She was in drydock there during October and November and, following sea trials, returned to San Diego in January 1950.

=== Korean War ===
Shelton sailed west again on 1 May 1950. When hostilities began in Korea, on 25 June, the destroyer was a unit of Task Force 77 (TF 77), the Striking Force of the 7th Fleet. She served on both coasts of Korea until returning to San Diego on 8 February 1951. After six months in the states, she was on her way back to the war zone in late August. As a fleet destroyer, she served with TF 72, 77, 95, 96, and 97.

Shelton also participated in special bombardment missions. With Helena (CA-75) at Hŭngnam on 25 October, she was taken under fire by enemy shore batteries and sustained one near miss. She was assigned to the bombline with Saint Paul (CA-73) in December; and, for a week, they shelled rail lines, bridges, and other targets of opportunity. In January 1952, they bombarded the Songjin area.

Assigned to TG 95 the following month, Shelton aided in the defense of Yang Do when North Korean forces attempted to land on that island. The action lasted from 01:30 until 11:00 and resulted in the landings being repulsed with heavy losses. Still in the area on the 22d, the destroyer was taken under fire by five communist batteries on the mainland. She sustained four direct hits and approximately 50 near misses. Her losses were 12 casualties and a five-foot hole in the bow, but she silenced the batteries and remained on station for two more days before retiring to Sasebo, Japan for repairs. She then returned to the Korean coast.

Shelton returned to San Diego on 10 April where she began an upkeep period and then conducted local operations until 13 November. On that date, the destroyer sailed for her third tour of duty in the Far East during the Korean War. She arrived at Sasebo on 1 December 1952 for a three-day tender availability before joining TF 77. She operated with that task force for 40 days before entering Yokosuka, Japan, for an upkeep period. Ready for sea on 26 January 1953, the destroyer joined the Formosa Patrol. Her next assignment was in Wonsan Harbor for 40 days, after which she again joined TF 95. Her deployment ended on the west coast on 29 June 1953.

From 1953 to 1959, Shelton divided her time between deployments with the 7th Fleet and west coast operations. On her annual deployment in 1957, she rescued 120 passengers from a New Zealand merchant ship.

She was on the west coast in 1960 and, from July to June 1961, she underwent Fleet Rehabilitation and Modernization (FRAM) conversion at the Long Beach Naval Shipyard. Shelton's home port was changed to Yokosuka, and she sailed from Long Beach on 6 January 1962 for that port from which she operated until early March 1964.

On 5 March, Shelton was ordered to Subic Bay where she was joined by the destroyers Blue (DD-744) and Frank Knox (DD-742), carrier Bon Homme Richard (CV-31), and oiler Cimarron (AO-22). All loaded to capacity with stores and consumable items and sailed, on 30 March, for the Indian Ocean on a six-week goodwill cruise. This was Operation Handclasp, designed to aid foreign countries in the supply of consumable goods. The squadron visited Madagascar, Kenya, and Saudi Arabia before presenting a firepower demonstration for the Shah of Iran on 4 May.

=== Vietnam War ===
The squadron was in Yokosuka two weeks later; but the deteriorating situation in Vietnam brought Shelton sailing orders to the South China Sea; and, on 2 June, she began a 28-day stay in the Gulf of Tonkin. The destroyer sailed for the west coast on 18 July, via Pearl Harbor, and arrived at her new home port, San Diego, on 31 August 1964.

Shelton operated from there until 24 August 1965, when she sailed to join the 7th Fleet off Vietnam. The destroyer provided anti-submarine protection and pilot rescue operations for Bon Homme Richard as well as firing numerous gunfire support missions. She was detached from the 7th Fleet on 1 February 1966 and returned to her home port the last of the month. The remainder of the year was spent in local operations with the exception of a midshipman cruise to Hawaii in June.

Shelton stood out of San Diego on 4 January 1967 and sailed for another tour off Vietnam. During the six and one-half months of her deployment, she performed such duties as: plane guard and anti-submarine warfare (ASW) protection at Yankee Station; screening Long Beach (CGN-9) on Piraz Station; gunfire support off South Vietnam; and gunfire support off North Vietnam. She returned to San Diego on 18 June and resumed normal stateside operations. Shelton was deployed to Guam from 2 January 1968 to 9 April, where she conducted operations in support of Polaris missile tests.

Shelton was to return to Vietnam from 30 September 1968 to 2 May 1969; from 2 March to 3 September 1970; and from 6 April to 7 October 1971. She had six line periods during 1968–1969; four in 1970; and five in 1971.

After Shelton returned to San Diego in October, she spent almost nine months operating out of her home port until she was notified that her services were again needed in Vietnam. The destroyer departed on 13 June 1972 on what was to be her last deployment to the western Pacific. She was back on the gunline on 10 July for a 25-day period. On 4 August, she was taken under fire by a barrage of approximately 40 rounds from a nearby wooded section of beach. Her gun crews quickly responded and were credited with destroying one of the enemy gun emplacements. Shelton and Providence (CLG-6) were taken under fire on 19 October when they were on an intercept mission five miles north of the Demilitarized Zone (DMZ). In the following 30 minutes, both ships fired over 120 rounds in an attempt to demolish the enemy sites. Immediately after observing four secondary explosions, Providence reported cross-fire from the island of Hon Co. Shelton bombarded the island and silenced the battery.

On 5 December, Shelton joined Task Unit 77.1.1 (TU 77.1.1) for a raid on targets in the vicinity of Hon Me Island. A barrage of return fire was received before counter battery fire from Shelton and Henry B. Wilson (DDG-7) silenced the emplacements. Another raid near Hon Me, on 19 December, brought the heaviest hostile fire of the deployment: approximately 700 rounds, with many splashes only 50 yards from the ship. Shelton departed the Tonkin Gulf three days later and returned to San Diego on 13 January 1973 to prepare for decommissioning.

Shelton was struck from the Navy list on 31 March 1973 and sold to the Republic of China on 18 April 1973.

== Republic of China Navy service ==
The ship served in the Republic of China Navy as ROCS Lai Yang, equipped with AAW capabilities and reclassified as DDG-920. She came under the Wu-Chin II modernization program in May 1980 and was mounted with a OTO Melara 76 mm gun in 1982.

She was decommissioned by Taiwan on 16 March 1999 and turned into an artificial reef in November 2002.

== Awards ==
Shelton received eight battle stars for service in the Korean War and eight for service in Vietnam.
