= James A. Shelton =

- Born: 1916; Denton, Montana
- Died: June 4, 1942 (aged 25–26); Near Midway Atoll
- Military career
- Allegiance: United States
- Branch: United States Navy
- Service years: 1941–1942
- Rank: Ensign
- Unit: Scouting Squadron Six (VS-6)
- Conflicts: World War II; *Battle of Midway
- Awards: Navy Cross (posthumous)

James A. Shelton was born in Denton, Montana, in 1916, and enlisted in the United States Navy on 15 January 1941. Appointed an aviation cadet on 20 March 1941, he trained at Pensacola, Miami, and San Diego.

On 17 April 1942, Ensign Shelton was assigned to Scouting Squadron Six (VS-6) aboard CV-6 USS Enterprise. On 4 June 1942, during the Battle of Midway, Ens. Shelton was flying an SBD Dauntless bomber designated 6-S-6 in the third division of his squadron. As the squadron attacked multiple Japanese aircraft carriers, the third division was observed to be following the second division's attack. However, none of the third division pilots returned to Enterprise and it is not known whether their planes were shot down during the attack or ran out of fuel. Shelton was reported missing and for his heroism and devotion to duty, he was posthumously awarded the Navy Cross.

Two ships were named USS Shelton after him:

- John C. Butler-class destroyer escort DE-407
- Gearing-class destroyer DD-790
