= Gault Wood =

Woodland in March, Cambridgeshire, England

- Location within Cambridgeshire
- Interactive map of Gault Wood

Geography
- Location: Cambridgeshire, England
- OS grid: TL399945
- Coordinates: 52.530°N 0.061°E
- Area: 6.51 hectares (16.09 acres)

Administration
- Authority: Woodland Trust

Gault Wood is a woodland in Cambridgeshire, England, near the town of March. It covers a total area of 6.51 hectares (16.09 acres). It is owned and managed by the Woodland Trust.
