= Thomas Galt =

American Presbyterian minister and abolitionist (1805–1857)

Thomas Galt (September 12, 1805 – September 12, 1857) was an American Presbyterian minister and abolitionist who organized two Presbyterian churches in Sangamon County, Illinois. He was vice-president of the Illinois Anti-Slavery Society and a conductor of the Underground Railroad.

== Biography ==
Thomas Galt was born in Lancaster County, Pennsylvania to James Galt and Mary Martin Galt. He graduated from Jefferson College in Canonsburg, Pennsylvania and later attended Presbyterian Theological Seminary in Allegheny City, Pennsylvania. Although licensed by the Presbytery of Ohio on June 18, 1834, he was ordained and installed as pastor in 1836 at Farmington Presbyterian Church in Farmington, IL, now known as Farmingdale in Sangamon County west of Springfield. The church's name changed from Farmington to Farmingdale around 1905, perhaps due to duplication and not to be confused with the city of Farmington, IL, in Fulton County west of Peoria which was founded in 1827.

In 1837 Galt answered the call by Elijah Lovejoy (American abolitionist and newspaper publisher) to attend the Anti-Slavery Convention in Upper Alton, Illinois. At the convention, Galt, Edward Beecher (brother of Harriet Beecher Stowe) and other attendees countered attempts by Illinois Attorney General Usher Linder to derail the proceedings.

The Anti-Slavery Convention ended sine die (without further plans) on October 28, 1837; however, the convention attendees reconvened the same day to form the Illinois Anti-Slavery Society. Galt was elected vice-president.

As a "new school" Presbyterian, Galt favored an early end of slavery. Owing to "old school" sentiment in the Farmington church, he moved on in April 1842 to form Center Presbyterian Church in Farmington, Illinois. He held meetings of the Sangamon County Anti-Slavery Society at Center Presbyterian Church.

On February 7, 1849, Galt organized another "new school" church, the Third Presbyterian Church in Springfield, Illinois.

Galt was reportedly a Sangamon County "conductor" of the Underground Railroad.

Galt was married to Sarah Happer. He died on September, 12th 1857 and is buried in Farmington Cemetery near the unincorporated community of Farmingdale, along with Sarah and other family members. Although the church changed names from Farmington to Farmingdale, the cemetery's name is still Farmington Cemetery and is on Farmington Cemetery Rd.
