= Hobson, Montana =

City in Montana, United States

Hobson
- City
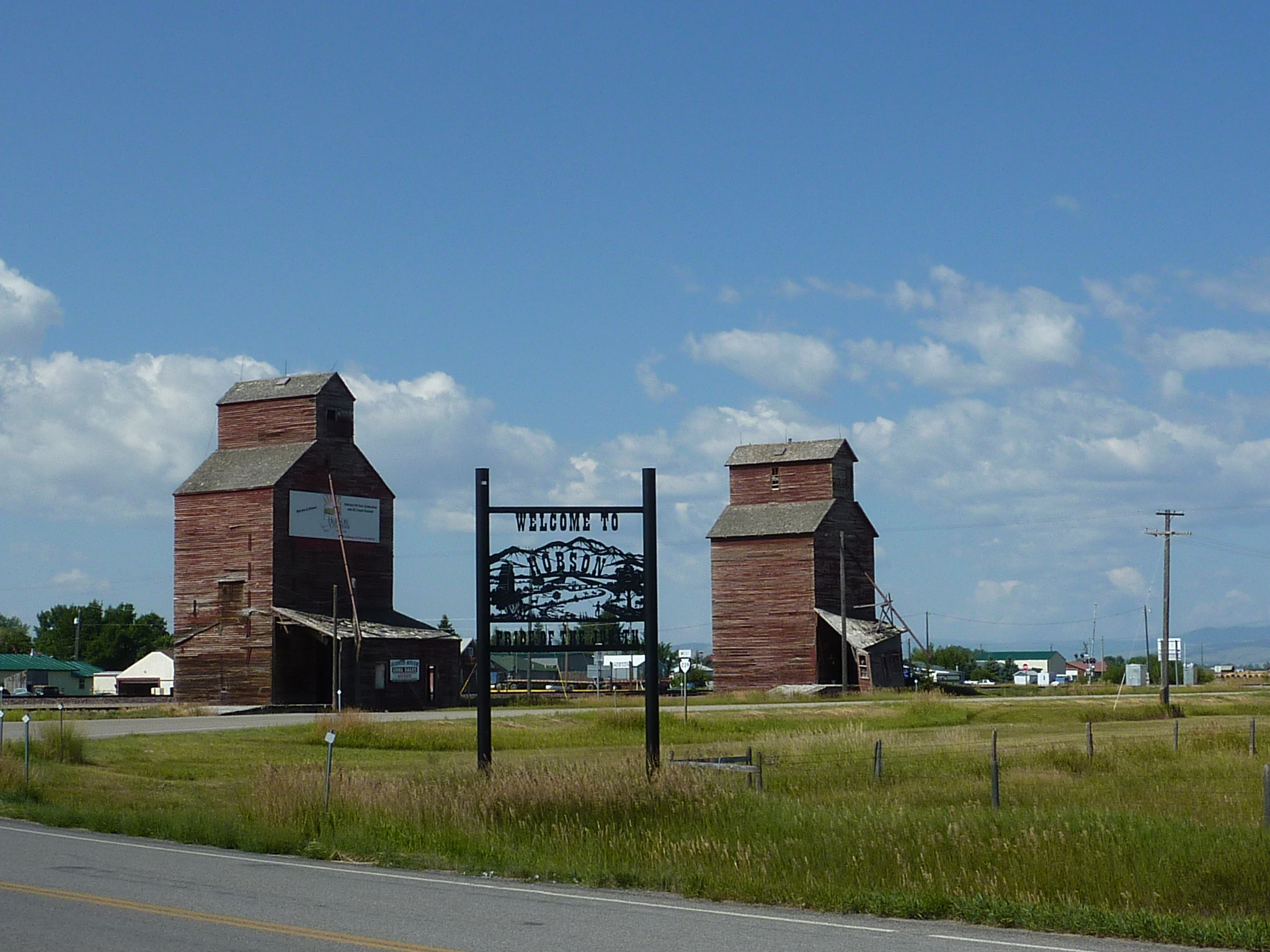
- Hobson, Montana

- Location of Hobson, Montana
- Coordinates: 46°59′55″N 109°52′28″W
- Country: United States
- State: Montana
- County: Judith Basin

Government
  - Mayor: Jay Wood

Area
  - Total: 0.21 sq mi (0.55 km^{2})
  - Land: 0.21 sq mi (0.55 km^{2})
  - Water: 0 sq mi (0.00 km^{2})
- Elevation: 4,105 ft (1,251 m)

Population (2020)
  - Total: 179
  - Density: 838.0/sq mi (323.55/km^{2})
- Time zone: UTC-7 (Mountain (MST))
  - Summer (DST): UTC-6 (MDT)
- ZIP code: 59452
- Area code: 406
- FIPS code: 30-36700
- GNIS feature ID: 2410772

Hobson is a city in Judith Basin County, Montana, United States. The population was 179 at the 2020 census.

As the freight-wagon crossing of the Judith River between Fort Benton, Montana and the Musselshell River country, the community was once known as the “Gateway to the Judith Basin.” In 1881, the post office opened under the name Philbrook. In 1908, however, the Great Northern Railway’s Billings and Northern branch line established another town four miles west. After some dispute the railroad decided on the town name Hobson, after the owner of the new townsite.

== Geography ==
Hobson is located off of U.S. Route 87 According to the United States Census Bureau, the city has a total area of 0.24 square miles (0.62 km^{2}), all land.

=== Climate ===
The Köppen Climate system classifies the weather as semi-arid, abbreviated as BSk.

Climate data for Moccasin Experimental Station, Montana, 1991–2020 normals, extremes 1909–present
Month	Jan	Feb	Mar	Apr	May	Jun	Jul	Aug	Sep	Oct	Nov	Dec	Year
Record high °F (°C)	72 (22)	74 (23)	77 (25)	87 (31)	93 (34)	101 (38)	102 (39)	103 (39)	98 (37)	91 (33)	79 (26)	72 (22)	103 (39)
Mean maximum °F (°C)	58.3 (14.6)	57.4 (14.1)	67.1 (19.5)	75.0 (23.9)	80.3 (26.8)	86.7 (30.4)	94.2 (34.6)	95.0 (35.0)	90.7 (32.6)	80.7 (27.1)	67.1 (19.5)	57.0 (13.9)	97.0 (36.1)
Mean daily maximum °F (°C)	36.9 (2.7)	37.6 (3.1)	45.3 (7.4)	53.3 (11.8)	62.4 (16.9)	70.7 (21.5)	81.7 (27.6)	81.8 (27.7)	70.9 (21.6)	57.4 (14.1)	45.0 (7.2)	37.1 (2.8)	56.7 (13.7)
Daily mean °F (°C)	24.9 (−3.9)	25.5 (−3.6)	32.7 (0.4)	40.6 (4.8)	49.8 (9.9)	57.7 (14.3)	66.0 (18.9)	65.8 (18.8)	56.2 (13.4)	44.0 (6.7)	32.9 (0.5)	25.3 (−3.7)	43.4 (6.4)
Mean daily minimum °F (°C)	12.9 (−10.6)	13.5 (−10.3)	20.2 (−6.6)	27.9 (−2.3)	37.2 (2.9)	44.8 (7.1)	50.3 (10.2)	49.7 (9.8)	41.4 (5.2)	30.5 (−0.8)	20.8 (−6.2)	13.5 (−10.3)	30.2 (−1.0)
Mean minimum °F (°C)	−13.4 (−25.2)	−9.8 (−23.2)	0.3 (−17.6)	12.6 (−10.8)	24.1 (−4.4)	34.2 (1.2)	40.3 (4.6)	39.4 (4.1)	28.3 (−2.1)	11.9 (−11.2)	−2.8 (−19.3)	−11.2 (−24.0)	−22.0 (−30.0)
Record low °F (°C)	−42 (−41)	−48 (−44)	−29 (−34)	−18 (−28)	2 (−17)	24 (−4)	31 (−1)	27 (−3)	4 (−16)	−19 (−28)	−32 (−36)	−41 (−41)	−48 (−44)
Average precipitation inches (mm)	0.46 (12)	0.38 (9.7)	0.64 (16)	1.43 (36)	2.64 (67)	2.74 (70)	1.63 (41)	1.68 (43)	1.48 (38)	1.12 (28)	0.52 (13)	0.42 (11)	15.14 (384.7)
Average snowfall inches (cm)	8.1 (21)	5.9 (15)	6.7 (17)	7.5 (19)	1.7 (4.3)	0.0 (0.0)	0.0 (0.0)	0.0 (0.0)	0.2 (0.51)	3.1 (7.9)	5.5 (14)	5.8 (15)	44.5 (113.71)
Average precipitation days (≥ 0.01 in)	5.7	5.6	7.1	10.4	12.8	12.3	8.9	8.6	7.3	7.8	6.1	6.4	99.0
Average snowy days (≥ 0.1 in)	4.9	5.1	5.2	4.0	1.0	0.0	0.0	0.0	0.2	1.9	4.4	5.3	32.0
Source 1: NOAA
Source 2: National Weather Service

== Demographics ==
Historical population
Census	Pop.	Note	%±
1930	240		—
1940	239		−0.4%
1950	205		−14.2%
1960	207		1.0%
1970	192		−7.2%
1980	261		35.9%
1990	226		−13.4%
2000	244		8.0%
2010	215		−11.9%
2020	179		−16.7%
U.S. Decennial Census

=== 2010 census ===
As of the census of 2010, there were 215 people, 98 households, and 63 families residing in the city. The population density was 895.8 inhabitants per square mile (345.9/km^{2}). There were 123 housing units at an average density of 512.5 per square mile (197.9/km^{2}). The racial makeup of the city was 98.1% White and 1.9% Native American. Hispanic or Latino of any race were 0.5% of the population.

There were 98 households, of which 25.5% had children under the age of 18 living with them, 50.0% were married couples living together, 11.2% had a female householder with no husband present, 3.1% had a male householder with no wife present, and 35.7% were non-families. 29.6% of all households were made up of individuals, and 15.3% had someone living alone who was 65 years of age or older. The average household size was 2.19 and the average family size was 2.70.

The median age in the city was 48.4 years. 21.4% of residents were under the age of 18; 4.6% were between the ages of 18 and 24; 20.4% were from 25 to 44; 27.9% were from 45 to 64; and 25.6% were 65 years of age or older. The gender makeup of the city was 46.5% male and 53.5% female.

=== 2000 census ===
As of the census of 2000, there were 244 people, 108 households, and 77 families residing in the city. The population density was 971.0 inhabitants per square mile (374.9/km^{2}). There were 128 housing units at an average density of 509.4 per square mile (196.7/km^{2}). The racial makeup of the city was 99.18% White and 0.82% Native American. Hispanic or Latino of any race were 0.41% of the population.

There were 108 households, out of which 25.9% had children under the age of 18 living with them, 59.3% were married couples living together, 10.2% had a female householder with no husband present, and 27.8% were non-families. 25.0% of all households were made up of individuals, and 10.2% had someone living alone who was 65 years of age or older. The average household size was 2.26 and the average family size was 2.71. In the city the population was spread out, with 24.6% under the age of 18, 3.3% from 18 to 24, 19.3% from 25 to 44, 34.0% from 45 to 64, and 18.9% who were 65 years of age or older. The median age was 46 years. For every 100 females there were 89.1 males. For every 100 females age 18 and over, there were 97.8 males.

The median income for a household in the city was $30,179, and the median income for a family was $35,139. Males had a median income of $21,750 versus $13,750 for females. The per capita income for the city was $15,002. About 19.2% of families and 20.7% of the population were below the poverty line, including 33.8% of those under the age of eighteen and 13.5% of those 65 or over.

== Government ==
Hobson has a mayor and town council. There are four members in the council. In 2026 Jay Wood became mayor. He defeated Loren Drivdahl who was unopposed for three election cycles. Drivdahl originally was appointed mayor to fill Dale Longfellow's place.

== Education ==
Hobson Public School educates students from kindergarten through 12th grade. They are part of an athletic co-op with Moore, Montana. The joint team name is Titans.

== Media ==
The Judith Basin Press is the local newspaper. It is published weekly.

Several scenes of the 1974 released movie, Thunderbolt and Lightfoot starring Clint Eastwood and Jeff Bridges were filmed in Hobson. The scenes were shot in the summer of 1973 in the St. John's Lutheran Church, the adjacent wheat field, and in the Black Bull Bar & Steakhouse.
