= William W. Galt (politician) =

American politician (1854–1945)

William W. Galt (May 8, 1854 – February 22, 1945) was an American farmer and politician.

Galt was born in Rock County, Wisconsin. He lived in Myrtle, Stearns County, Minnesota with his wife and family. Galt was involved with the Myrtle township government and served in different township offices. He served in the Minnesota House of Representatives from 1899 to1902.
