= Denton, Montana =

Town in Fergus County, Montana, United States

- Town
- Logo

- Location of Denton, Montana
- Coordinates: 47°19′20″N 109°56′53″W
- Country: United States
- State: Montana
- County: Fergus

Area
  - Total: 0.71 sq mi (1.85 km^{2})
  - Land: 0.71 sq mi (1.85 km^{2})
  - Water: 0 sq mi (0.00 km^{2})
- Elevation: 3,593 ft (1,095 m)

Population (2020)
  - Total: 205
  - Density: 287.4/sq mi (110.96/km^{2})
- Time zone: UTC-7 (Mountain (MST))
  - Summer (DST): UTC-6 (MDT)
- ZIP code: 59430
- Area code: 406
- FIPS code: 30-20425
- GNIS feature ID: 2412418
- Website: dentonmt.gov

Denton is a town in Fergus County, Montana, United States. The population was 205 at the 2020 census.

Central Montana Rail, Inc. is headquartered in Denton.

== History ==
A post office called Denton has been in operation since 1888. It was named after the Missouri county where the postmaster previously lived. Another source says the name came from the Dent brothers who owned the land where the town was founded. The town was established at its present site when the railroad was extended to that point.

The fast-moving West Wind Fire swept through the town in December 2021. Twelve families lost their homes. The wildfire destroyed or damaged many structures including garages, barns and grain elevators. There were no serious injuries as the town was evacuated minutes before the fire, which burned 10,000 acres (4,000 ha), reached the town.

== Geography ==
Montana Highway 81 passes through town. It is located in Judith Basin near Dry Wolf Creek. According to the United States Census Bureau, the town has a total area of 0.76 square miles (1.97 km^{2}), all land.

== Demographics ==
Historical population
Census	Pop.	Note	%±
1920	431		—
1930	345		−20.0%
1940	406		17.7%
1950	435		7.1%
1960	410		−5.7%
1970	398		−2.9%
1980	356		−10.6%
1990	350		−1.7%
2000	301		−14.0%
2010	255		−15.3%
2020	205		−19.6%
U.S. Decennial Census

=== 2010 census ===
As of the census of 2010, there were 255 people, 120 households, and 64 families living in the town. The population density was 335.5 inhabitants per square mile (129.5/km^{2}). There were 156 housing units at an average density of 205.3 per square mile (79.3/km^{2}). The racial makeup of the town was 99.2% White and 0.8% from two or more races. Hispanic or Latino people of any race were 2.0% of the population.

There were 120 households, of which 23.3% had children under the age of 18 living with them, 45.0% were married couples living together, 4.2% had a female householder with no husband present, 4.2% had a male householder with no wife present, and 46.7% were non-families. 42.5% of all households were made up of individuals, and 21.7% had someone living alone who was 65 years of age or older. The average household size was 2.13 and the average family size was 2.92.

The median age in the town was 44.8 years. 22.7% of residents were under the age of 18; 5.6% were between the ages of 18 and 24; 22% were from 25 to 44; 22.7% were from 45 to 64; and 27.1% were 65 years of age or older. The gender makeup of the town was 51.8% male and 48.2% female.

=== 2000 census ===
As of the census of 2000, there were 301 people, 133 households, and 82 families living in the town. The population density was 395.4 inhabitants per square mile (152.7/km^{2}). There were 158 housing units at an average density of 207.6 per square mile (80.2/km^{2}). The racial makeup of the town was 99.34% White, and 0.66% from two or more races. Hispanic or Latino people of any race were 1.00% of the population.

There were 133 households, out of which 24.8% had children under the age of 18 living with them, 56.4% were married couples living together, 4.5% had a female householder with no husband present, and 37.6% were non-families. 34.6% of all households were made up of individuals, and 15.0% had someone living alone who was 65 years of age or older. The average household size was 2.26 and the average family size was 2.96.

In the town, the population was spread out, with 24.6% under the age of 18, 7.3% from 18 to 24, 21.6% from 25 to 44, 24.3% from 45 to 64, and 22.3% who were 65 years of age or older. The median age was 42 years. For every 100 females there were 109.0 males. For every 100 females age 18 and over, there were 100.9 males.

The median income for a household in the town was $28,393, and the median income for a family was $32,232. Males had a median income of $23,125 versus $16,528 for females. The per capita income for the town was $14,982. About 5.9% of families and 8.5% of the population were below the poverty line, including 4.9% of those under the age of eighteen and 2.4% of those 65 or over.

== Government ==
Stephanie C. Stolle was elected mayor in 2025.

== Education ==
Denton Public Schools educates students from kindergarten through 12th grade. They are known as the Trojans. Denton High School had 19 students in 2021. There were 10 students in the 2023-2024 school year.

== Notable people ==
- Nada Bakos, CIA analyst and target officer
- Don Koehler, one of the few people on record to grow over eight feet tall
- James A. Shelton, Navy ensign who received the Navy Cross posthumously for his service during the Battle of Midway

== See also ==
- List of municipalities in Montana
