= Geyser, Montana =

Town in Montana, United States

- Census-designated place
- Location within Montana Location within the United States
- Coordinates: 47°15′42″N 110°29′50″W
- County: Judith Basin County, Montana

Area
  - Total: 0.89 sq mi (2.31 km^{2})
  - Land: 0.89 sq mi (2.31 km^{2})
  - Water: 0 sq mi (0.00 km^{2})
- Elevation: 4,157 ft (1,267 m)

Population (2020)
  - Total: 78
  - Density: 87.6/sq mi (33.84/km^{2})
- ZIP Code: 59447
- Area code: 406
- FIPS code: 30-30550
- GNIS feature ID: 2629756

Geyser is an unincorporated community and census-designated place (CDP) in Judith Basin County, Montana, United States. As of the 2020 census it had a population of 78.

== History ==
The town's name originated from the mud springs in the area in which the town was first founded. P. J. O’Hara, considered the father of Geyser, started a hotel here in 1887, and other businesses soon followed. Geyser was moved to its present location with the construction of the Great Northern rail line between Great Falls and Billings.

== Geography ==
Geyser is in northwestern Judith Basin County in a broad valley between the Highwood Mountains to the north and the Little Belt Mountains to the south. U.S. Route 87 runs along the south edge of the community, leading 46 miles (74 km) northwest to Great Falls and 15 miles (24 km) southeast to Stanford, the Judith Basin county seat.

According to the U.S. Census Bureau, the Geyser CDP has an area of 0.89 square miles (2.3 km^{2}), all of it recorded as land. The community sits on a low bench between McCarthy Creek to the east and Crow Coulee to the west. The two creeks flow north to Hay Creek, a tributary of Arrow Creek, which flows northeast to the Missouri River.

== Demographics ==
Historical population
Census	Pop.	Note	%±
2020	78		—
U.S. Decennial Census

As of the 2020 census, the population of the CDP was 78. The racial makeup of the CDP was 96.8% White, 0.2% Native American, and 2.3% from two or more races. Hispanic or Latino of any race were 0.7% of the population.

As of the 2010 census it had a population of 87.

== Education ==
Geyser High School's mascot is the Wranglers; for sports though, Geyser is co-oped with nearby Stanford, Denton, and Geraldine schools to form the DGGS Bearcats. 13 students were enrolled in 2020. In 2023, there were 20 students in the 7th-12th grade range, and 16 students in the PreK-6th grade range.

== Media ==
The Judith Basin Press is the local newspaper. It is published weekly.
