= Judith Basin County, Montana =

County in Montana, United States

- County
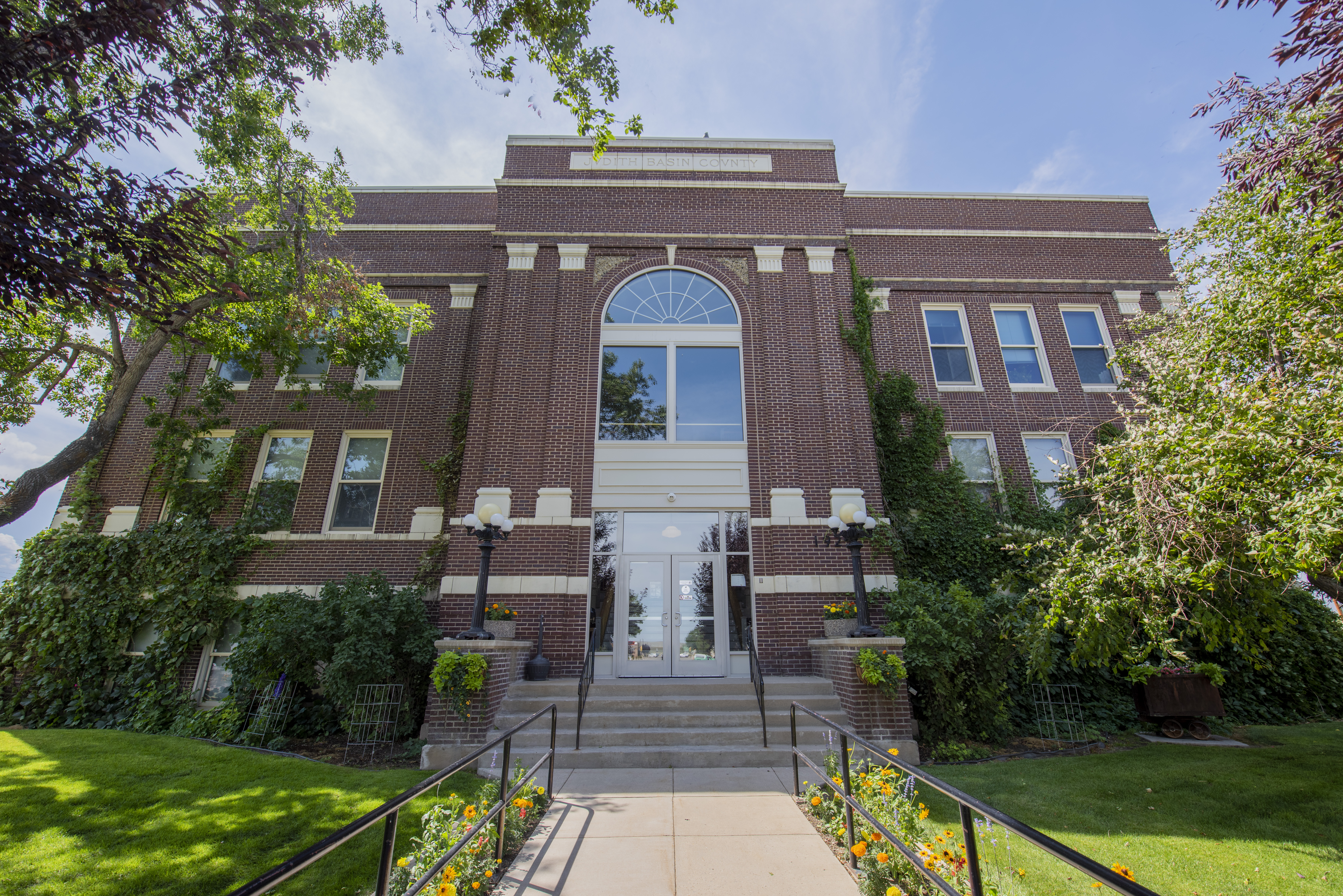
- Judith Basin County Courthouse in Stanford

- Location within the U.S. state of Montana
- Coordinates: 47°02′N 110°16′W
- Country: United States
- State: Montana
- Founded: December 10, 1920
- Seat: Stanford
- Largest town: Stanford

Area
  - Total: 1,871 sq mi (4,850 km^{2})
  - Land: 1,870 sq mi (4,800 km^{2})
  - Water: 0.8 sq mi (2.1 km^{2}) 0.04%

Population (2020)
  - Total: 2,023
  - Estimate (2025): 2,162 ▲
  - Density: 1.1/sq mi (0.42/km^{2})
- Time zone: UTC−7 (Mountain)
  - Summer (DST): UTC−6 (MDT)
- Congressional district: 2nd
- Website: jbcountymt.gov
- Montana county number 36

Judith Basin County is a county in the U.S. state of Montana. As of the 2020 census, the population was 2,023. Its county seat is the town of Stanford.

The economy is primarily based on agriculture. Recreation includes hiking, hunting, fishing, camping, snowmobiling and skiing.

== History ==
Judith Basin County was formed of area taken from western Fergus County and eastern Cascade County on December 10, 1920. The county derives its name from the Judith River. In 1895, Yogo sapphires were discovered at Yogo Gulch, about 15 miles southwest of Utica, which at the time was in Fergus County.

In 2022 the invasive Eastern Heath Snail was found in the county.

== Geography ==
According to the United States Census Bureau, the county has a total area of 1,871 square miles (4,850 km^{2}), of which 1,870 square miles (4,800 km^{2}) is land and 0.8 square miles (2.1 km^{2}) (0.04%) is water. It is in a basin between the Highwood, Big Snowy, and Little Belt mountains.

=== Adjacent counties ===
- Chouteau County – north
- Fergus County – east
- Wheatland County – south
- Meagher County – south
- Cascade County – west

=== Protected areas ===
- Lewis and Clark National Forest (part)
- Ackley Lake State Park
- Judith River Wildlife Management Area

=== City ===
- Stanford

=== Town ===
- Stanford (county seat)
- Hobson

=== Census-designated places ===
- Geyser
- Moccasin
- Raynesford
- Sapphire Ridge
- Surprise Creek Colony
- Utica
- Windham

=== Other unincorporated communities ===
- Arrow Creek
- Benchland
- Hughesville
- Kolin
- Lehigh
- Sapphire Village
- Sipple
- Spion Kop
- Utica

=== Former town ===
- Ubet

== Demographics ==
Historical population
Census	Pop.	Note	%±
1930	5,238		—
1940	3,655		−30.2%
1950	3,200		−12.4%
1960	3,085		−3.6%
1970	2,667		−13.5%
1980	2,646		−0.8%
1990	2,282		−13.8%
2000	2,329		2.1%
2010	2,072		−11.0%
2020	2,023		−2.4%
2025 (est.)	2,162	▲	6.9%
U.S. Decennial Census:

=== 2020 census ===
As of the 2020 census, the county had a population of 2,023. Of the residents, 18.6% were under the age of 18 and 28.5% were 65 years of age or older; the median age was 51.4 years. For every 100 females there were 107.9 males, and for every 100 females age 18 and over there were 109.0 males. 0.0% of residents lived in urban areas and 100.0% lived in rural areas.

The racial makeup of the county was 93.7% White, 0.4% Black or African American, 0.0% American Indian and Alaska Native, 0.2% Asian, 0.9% from some other race, and 4.5% from two or more races. Hispanic or Latino residents of any race comprised 2.4% of the population.

There were 912 households in the county, of which 23.5% had children under the age of 18 living with them and 18.5% had a female householder with no spouse or partner present. About 31.9% of all households were made up of individuals and 15.4% had someone living alone who was 65 years of age or older.

There were 1,248 housing units, of which 26.9% were vacant. Among occupied housing units, 77.6% were owner-occupied and 22.4% were renter-occupied. The homeowner vacancy rate was 1.0% and the rental vacancy rate was 8.1%.

=== 2010 census ===
As of the 2010 census, there were 2,072 people, 924 households, and 600 families in the county. The population density was 1.1 inhabitants per square mile (0.42/km^{2}). There were 1,336 housing units at an average density of 0.7 per square mile (0.27/km^{2}). The racial makeup of the county was 98.3% white, 0.8% American Indian, 0.1% Asian, 0.1% from other races, and 0.7% from two or more races. Those of Hispanic or Latino origin made up 1.2% of the population. In terms of ancestry, 30.9% were German, 16.7% were English, 16.1% were Irish, 10.3% were Norwegian, 6.7% were Czech, 5.0% were Danish, and 1.7% were American.

Of the 924 households, 24.0% had children under the age of 18 living with them, 55.7% were married couples living together, 5.2% had a female householder with no husband present, 35.1% were non-families, and 30.3% of all households were made up of individuals. The average household size was 2.24 and the average family size was 2.80. The median age was 48.3 years.

The median income for a household in the county was $41,473 and the median income for a family was $54,479. Males had a median income of $36,295 versus $29,750 for females. The per capita income for the county was $24,029. About 6.4% of families and 9.9% of the population were below the poverty line, including 8.9% of those under age 18 and 9.0% of those age 65 or over.

== Politics ==
The small county strongly leans Republican; a Democrat has not won the county in a presidential race since Lyndon Johnson's landslide win in 1964.

United States presidential election results for Judith Basin County, Montana
Year	Republican		Democratic		Third party(ies)	
Year	No.	%	No.	%	No.	%
1924	888	41.34%	480	22.35%	780	36.31%
1928	1,342	56.77%	978	41.37%	44	1.86%
1932	720	33.79%	1,280	60.07%	131	6.15%
1936	645	28.91%	1,534	68.76%	52	2.33%
1940	670	35.02%	1,215	63.51%	28	1.46%
1944	691	39.55%	1,049	60.05%	7	0.40%
1948	609	36.64%	934	56.20%	119	7.16%
1952	1,074	57.96%	746	40.26%	33	1.78%
1956	789	48.20%	848	51.80%	0	0.00%
1960	721	46.10%	842	53.84%	1	0.06%
1964	678	45.14%	822	54.73%	2	0.13%
1968	804	53.03%	606	39.97%	106	6.99%
1972	961	59.54%	557	34.51%	96	5.95%
1976	809	50.12%	772	47.83%	33	2.04%
1980	1,030	63.31%	480	29.50%	117	7.19%
1984	1,050	67.74%	483	31.16%	17	1.10%
1988	902	59.50%	590	38.92%	24	1.58%
1992	610	42.16%	409	28.27%	428	29.58%
1996	753	56.28%	452	33.78%	133	9.94%
2000	1,057	75.82%	278	19.94%	59	4.23%
2004	944	73.41%	322	25.04%	20	1.56%
2008	801	64.81%	397	32.12%	38	3.07%
2012	854	70.29%	337	27.74%	24	1.98%
2016	872	72.19%	235	19.45%	101	8.36%
2020	1,040	77.38%	275	20.46%	29	2.16%
2024	1,051	77.68%	265	19.59%	37	2.73%

== See also ==
- List of lakes in Judith Basin County, Montana
- List of mountains in Judith Basin County, Montana
- National Register of Historic Places listings in Judith Basin County, Montana
