= Stanford, Montana =

- Town
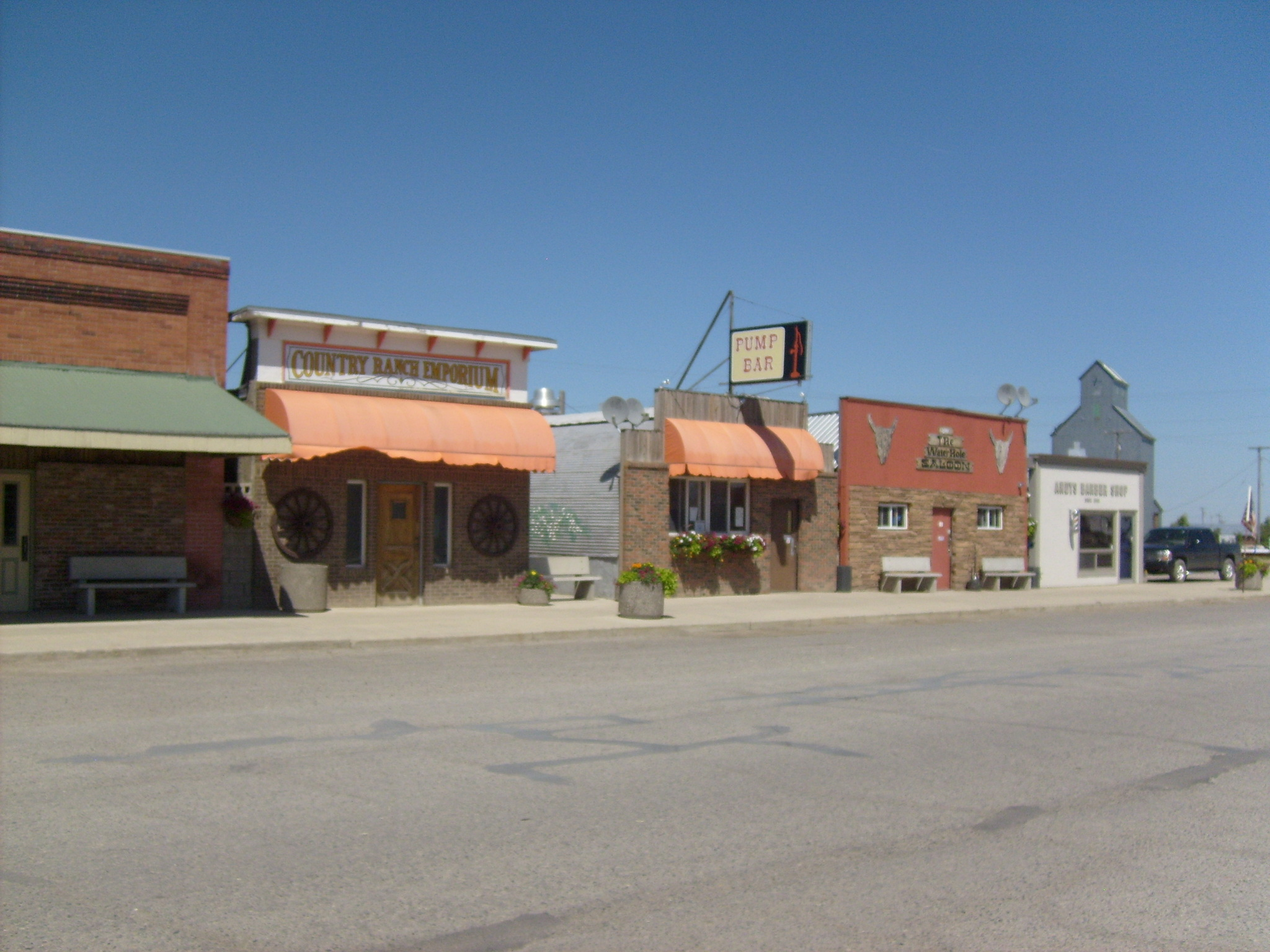
- Central Avenue Stanford

- Location of Stanford, Montana
- Coordinates: 47°09′07″N 110°13′08″W
- Country: United States
- State: Montana
- County: Judith Basin

Area
  - Total: 0.43 sq mi (1.11 km^{2})
  - Land: 0.43 sq mi (1.11 km^{2})
  - Water: 0 sq mi (0.00 km^{2})
- Elevation: 4,285 ft (1,306 m)

Population (2020)
  - Total: 403
  - Density: 939.0/sq mi (362.56/km^{2})
- Time zone: UTC-7 (Mountain (MST))
  - Summer (DST): UTC-6 (MDT)
- ZIP code: 59479
- Area code: 406
- FIPS code: 30-70675
- GNIS feature ID: 2413327

Stanford is a town in and the county seat of Judith Basin County, Montana, United States. The population was at 403 as of the 2020 census.

Stanford was frequented by C.M. Russell and is featured in some of his landscape paintings.

== History ==
Stanford began with the establishment of a trading post by Thomas C. Power in 1875. In 1908 the town moved about 3 miles to be next to the new railroad.

== Geography ==
According to the United States Census Bureau, the town has a total area of 0.44 square miles (1.14 km^{2}), all land.

Stanford is located in a basin between the Highwood, Big Snowy, and Little Belt mountains. It is a largely agricultural area which includes livestock and small grains. U.S. Route 87 passes through town.

Nearby Ackley Lake State Park is one of the few public lakes in Central Montana. It provides recreational activities, including fishing for several types of trout and kokanee salmon.

=== Climate ===
Climate data for Stanford, Montana, 1991–2020 normals, extremes 1927–present
Month	Jan	Feb	Mar	Apr	May	Jun	Jul	Aug	Sep	Oct	Nov	Dec	Year
Record high °F (°C)	71 (22)	73 (23)	78 (26)	87 (31)	92 (33)	102 (39)	103 (39)	104 (40)	99 (37)	90 (32)	78 (26)	70 (21)	104 (40)
Mean maximum °F (°C)	60.6 (15.9)	58.6 (14.8)	65.9 (18.8)	74.4 (23.6)	79.9 (26.6)	87.2 (30.7)	93.5 (34.2)	93.3 (34.1)	88.9 (31.6)	79.3 (26.3)	67.6 (19.8)	57.9 (14.4)	95.4 (35.2)
Mean daily maximum °F (°C)	38.0 (3.3)	38.1 (3.4)	46.0 (7.8)	54.1 (12.3)	63.0 (17.2)	71.1 (21.7)	81.6 (27.6)	81.1 (27.3)	71.0 (21.7)	57.3 (14.1)	45.1 (7.3)	37.5 (3.1)	57.0 (13.9)
Daily mean °F (°C)	26.8 (−2.9)	27.0 (−2.8)	34.4 (1.3)	42.0 (5.6)	50.6 (10.3)	58.5 (14.7)	66.9 (19.4)	66.3 (19.1)	57.3 (14.1)	45.0 (7.2)	34.1 (1.2)	26.7 (−2.9)	44.6 (7.0)
Mean daily minimum °F (°C)	15.5 (−9.2)	16.0 (−8.9)	22.7 (−5.2)	29.9 (−1.2)	38.2 (3.4)	46.0 (7.8)	52.3 (11.3)	51.5 (10.8)	43.5 (6.4)	32.8 (0.4)	23.0 (−5.0)	16.0 (−8.9)	32.3 (0.1)
Mean minimum °F (°C)	−14.2 (−25.7)	−9.9 (−23.3)	−1.6 (−18.7)	12.4 (−10.9)	24.0 (−4.4)	34.1 (1.2)	40.5 (4.7)	38.9 (3.8)	27.9 (−2.3)	10.9 (−11.7)	−2.4 (−19.1)	−11.6 (−24.2)	−22.9 (−30.5)
Record low °F (°C)	−42 (−41)	−44 (−42)	−29 (−34)	−19 (−28)	2 (−17)	23 (−5)	29 (−2)	29 (−2)	15 (−9)	−11 (−24)	−35 (−37)	−40 (−40)	−44 (−42)
Average precipitation inches (mm)	0.57 (14)	0.48 (12)	0.86 (22)	1.90 (48)	3.10 (79)	3.00 (76)	1.70 (43)	1.61 (41)	1.50 (38)	1.31 (33)	0.69 (18)	0.60 (15)	17.32 (439)
Average precipitation days (≥ 0.01 in)	6.2	7.1	7.9	10.5	12.6	13.1	9.7	8.6	7.3	7.6	5.9	6.4	102.9
Source 1: NOAA
Source 2: National Weather Service

== Demographics ==
Historical population
Census	Pop.	Note	%±
1920	300		—
1930	509		69.7%
1940	529		3.9%
1950	542		2.5%
1960	615		13.5%
1970	505		−17.9%
1980	595		17.8%
1990	529		−11.1%
2000	454		−14.2%
2010	401		−11.7%
2020	403		0.5%
U.S. Decennial Census

As of 2000 the median income for a household in the town was $22,679, and the median income for a family was $34,479. Males had a median income of $22,813 versus $20,000 for females. The per capita income for the town was $15,253. About 9.7% of families and 13.8% of the population were below the poverty line, including 22.5% of those under age 18 and 5.6% of those age 65 or over.

=== 2010 census ===
As of the census of 2010, there were 401 people, 198 households, and 110 families residing in the town. The population density was 911.4 inhabitants per square mile (351.9/km^{2}). There were 247 housing units at an average density of 561.4 per square mile (216.8/km^{2}). The racial makeup of the town was 97.3% White, 0.2% African American, 2.0% Native American, 0.2% from other races, and 0.2% from two or more races. Hispanic or Latino of any race were 1.5% of the population.

There were 198 households, of which 22.2% had children under the age of 18 living with them, 47.0% were married couples living together, 5.1% had a female householder with no husband present, 3.5% had a male householder with no wife present, and 44.4% were non-families. 40.4% of all households were made up of individuals, and 17.7% had someone living alone who was 65 years of age or older. The average household size was 2.03 and the average family size was 2.72.

The median age in the town was 49.4 years. 19.5% of residents were under the age of 18; 3.2% were between the ages of 18 and 24; 18.6% were from 25 to 44; 37.2% were from 45 to 64; and 21.4% were 65 years of age or older. The gender makeup of the town was 51.4% male and 48.6% female.

== Economy ==
The economy is based on agriculture. In 2023, the Redwood Group, a leading supplier of grains for premium pet food, agreed to operate a pulse processing, storage, and transloading facility in Stanford.

== Arts and culture ==
Stanford water tower and the Judith Basin County Fairgrounds in 2026

The Judith Basin County Museum is in town. It is a local history museum with a wide range of artifacts and displays.

The CMR Stampede is an annual PRCA rodeo held in Stanford. This large community event features a street dance, pancake breakfast, barbecue dinner, running and bike races, and a quickdraw art contest.

The Judith Basin County Free Library serves the town.

== Education ==
Stanford Public Schools educates students from kindergarten through 12th grade. Stanford High School is a Class C school (less than 108 students) which helps determine athletic competitions. They are known as the Wolves.

== Media ==
The Judith Basin Press is the local newspaper. It is published weekly.

The radio station KYPF, a Yellowstone Public Radio translator, is licensed in Stanford.

== Infrastructure ==
U.S. Highway 87 passes by the southwest side of Stanford. Montana Highway 80's southern terminus is at US 87, MT 3 and MT 200 in town.

Stanford Airport (Biggerstaff Field) is a county-owned, public-use airport located one mile (2 km) south of town.

== Notable people ==
- Albert Henry Ottenweller, Roman Catholic bishop
