= Aatsista-Mahkan =

Chief of the Siksika First Nation

Running Rabbit
- Aatsista-Mahkan
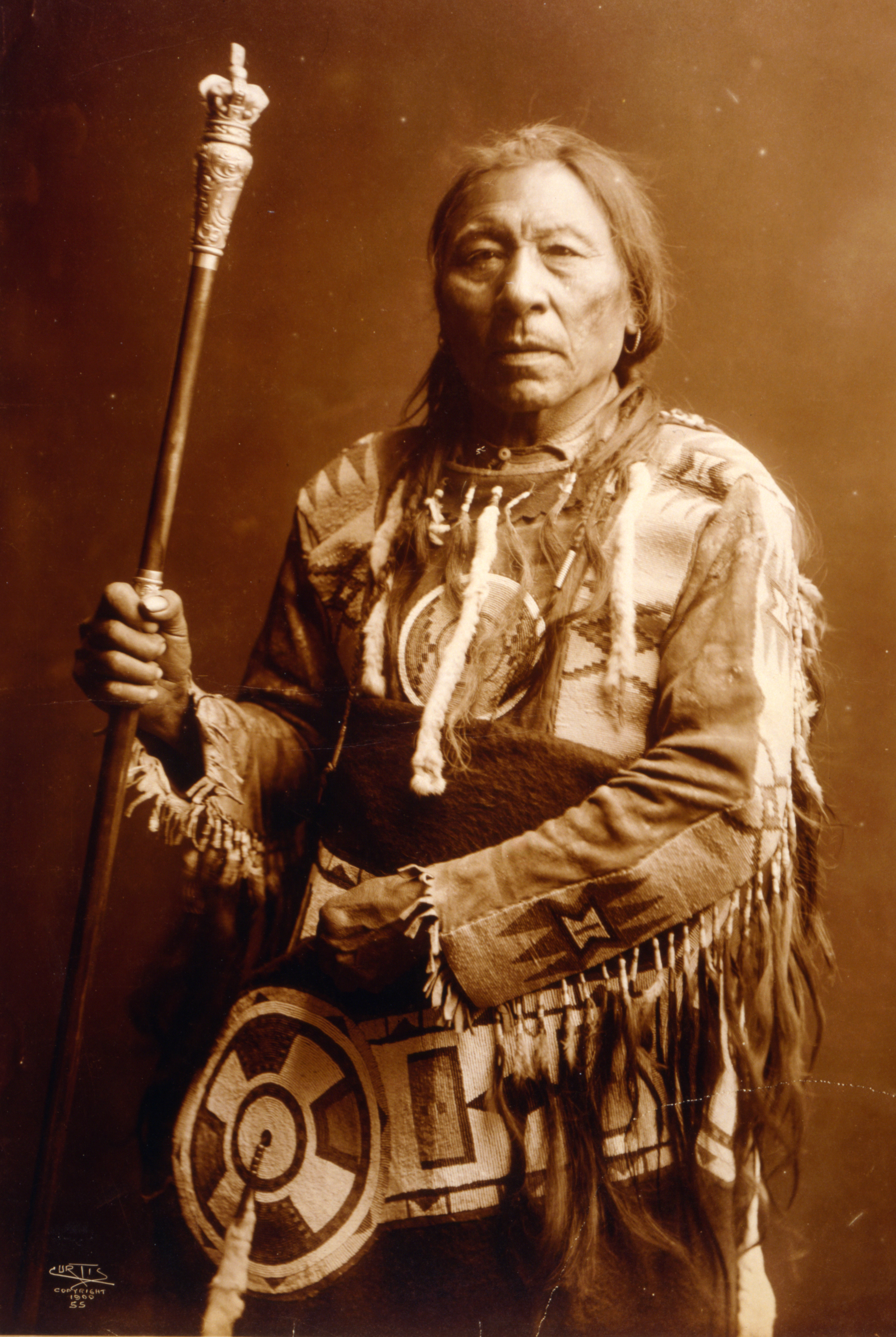
- Chief Running Rabbit photographed by Edward S. Curtis, c. 1900
- Born: c. 1833; Rupert's Land
- Died: c. 24 January 1911
- Known for: Chief of the Siksika people
- Parent: Many Swans (father)
- Relatives: Many Swans II (brother)

Running Rabbit (or Aatsista-Mahkan; c. 1833 – c. 24 January 1911) was a chief of the Siksika First Nation. He was the son of Akamukai (Many Swans), chief of the Biters band, and following the death of his father in 1871, Aatsista-Mahkan took control of the band. He was known for his generosity and kindness, and for his loyal protection of his family.

In 1877, he was a signatory to Treaty 7, but he and his people continued to follow the bison until 1881, when he and his people were designated to settle on a reserve, 60 miles east of today's Calgary, Alberta.

== Early life ==
Running Rabbit was born into a prominent family. His older brother, Many Swans II, was chief of the Biters band of Siksikas, to which his family belonged. As a teenager and young warrior, Running Rabbit had not performed any great deeds worthy of recognition until his brother lent him an amulet said to have spiritual powers made from a mirror decorated with eagle feathers, ermine skins, and magpie feathers. Running Rabbit was successful during his first raid as a warrior, gaining himself two enemy horses which he captured and gifted to his father, Many Swans. Similar success during following expeditions resulted in Many Swans giving Running Rabbit an amulet as a gift. Word of Running Rabbit's success spread throughout the Biters band and many referred to him as the "young chief" before he earned or was appointed any leadership position in the band.

== Chief of the Biters band ==
During the autumn of 1871, Biters chief Many Swans died, resulting in Running Rabbit being appointed as chief of the Biters. During his career as a band chief, Running Rabbit was noted for his kindness, generosity and intelligence.

When Running Rabbit was among his band, his men were invited to eat, smoke, tell stories every day. He was generous. He gave his running horses out during hunts. Running Rabbit had four wives; two put up Sun Dances. He was kind to children and women.

— -Descendant of Running Rabbit

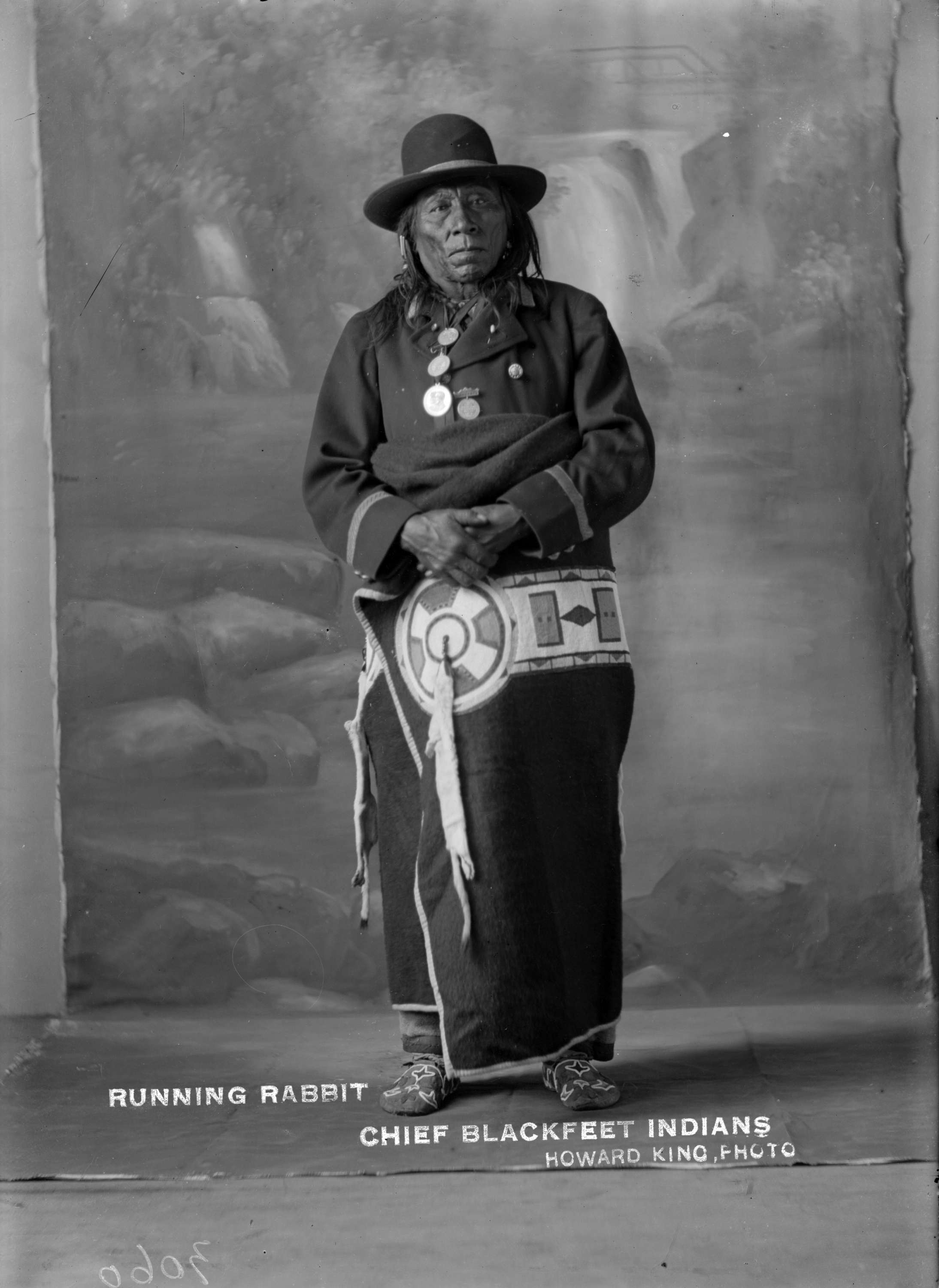
Chief Running Rabbit

Due to his intelligence and kindness, Running Rabbit was often looked upon to settle disputes within the band and nation. One incident happened during the early 1870s along the Oldman River where a man from the Biters band accidentally killed one of Crowfoot's daughters with a loaded gun. The man hid from Crowfoot, who sought to retaliate by killing him in Running Rabbit's teepee. Running Rabbit stressed to Crowfoot that the killing was an accident and gave Crowfoot some horses as added compensation. Though usually peaceful in settling disputes, Running Rabbit resorted to violence when the wellbeing of his family was threatened, with one noted incident involving Running Rabbit shooting a fellow Indian for beating his blind brother with a whip.

== Treaty No.7 signing ==
Running Rabbit signed Treaty No.7 with the Canadian government alongside other Siksika nation chiefs including Crowfoot and Old Sun. The treaty promised the Blackfoot Confederacy reserve lands, hunting rights, trapping rights, and annual provisions/and or payments from the Queen in exchange for all of the traditional territory of the confederacy with the exception of lands set aside for reservations. Running Rabbit was recognized as a minor Siksika chief and was listed as having 90 followers. Running Rabbit and his band continued to live a traditional nomadic lifestyle until the last bison herds within the area were destroyed in 1881, resulting in his band and others of the Siksika nation settling on their previously set aside reserve 60 miles east of Calgary Alberta. On the reservation, Running Rabbit was noted for trying to adapt to a new lifestyle that was forced upon them, becoming a noted farmer in 1887.

== Later life and death ==
In 1892, after the death of head chief No-okska-stumik (Three Bulls), Running Rabbit was appointed as one of the two head chiefs of the Siksika nation alongside fellow chief Old Sun. He remained known for his wisdom, kindness, and progressiveness. In 1898, he had made enough money harvesting hay to buy a high top buggy. Running Rabbit died in 1911.
