= Adrian Stimson =

First Nations artist

Adrian Stimson (born 1964 in Sault Ste. Marie, Ontario, Canada) is an artist and a member of the Siksika Nation.

== Education ==
Stimson earned a BFA with distinction from the Alberta College of Art and Design and an MFA from the University of Saskatchewan.

== Career ==
Stimson is a multidisciplinary artist: He creates paintings, installations, performances and video. His mostly black and white paintings often depict bison in fictional settings. In his installations, he refers to experiences in the residential school system. His performances look at constructing identity and the blending of the Indian, the cowboy, the shaman and the Two Spirit being. Two recurring personas in Stimson's performances are Buffalo Boy and the Shaman Exterminator.

Stimson travelled with the Canadian Forces Artists Program to Afghanistan in 2010.

In 2017, Stimson created, "TRENCH," a five-day durational performance on the Siksika (Blackfoot) Nation. The performance commemorates the approximately 4,000 Indigenous soldiers who served in the First World War. This contemporary art contributed to War Stories: 1917 at Calgary's Military Museums.

In 2019, Stimson collaborated with AA Bronson for the Toronto Biennial of Art on A public apology to Siksoka Nation by Bronson and Iini Sookumapii: Guess who’s coming to dinner? a work that explored the connection between two of their ancestors: Bronson's great-grandfather John William Tims, an Anglican missionary who established a residential school in 1886 and Stimson's great-grandfather Old Sun (1819–1897), the traditional chief of the North Blackfoot and a participant of the making of Treaty 7.

In 2020 he created a waterbed installation, a nod to Ono's and Lennon's famous bed-ins for peace as part of the Yoko Ono’s exhibition Growing Freedom at Contemporary Calgary.

== Collections ==
Two of Stimson's paintings are in the North American Indigenous collection of the British Museum. His work is included in the collections of the Glenbow Museum, Calgary, and the Alberta Foundation for the Arts.

== Awards ==
In 2018 he was awarded the Governor General's Award in Visual and Media Arts. Stimson won the Blackfoot Visual Arts Award in 2009, the Alberta Centennial Medal in 2005 and the Queen Elizabeth II Golden Jubilee Medal in 2003,
