= Vähälä =

Vähälä is a Finnish surname. Notable people with the surname include:

- Elina Vähälä (born 1975), Finnish classical violinist
- Kerry Vahala, American engineer
- Reijo Vähälä (1946–2024), Finnish high jumper
