= Big Snake =

Big Snake may refer to:

People

- Robin Big Snake (born 1984), Canadian former professional hockey player
- Omoxesisixany, a chief of the Blackfoot Native American tribe
- Big Snake (Ponca chief), a chief of the Ponca Native American tribe, and brother of the chief Standing Bear

Other:

- Snake Creek (Susquehanna River), Pennsylvania, sometimes called Big Snake Creek

== See also ==
- Grootslang (Dutch for "big snake"), a legendary cryptid alleged to live in South Africa
