= Corey Gray =

Native American physicist

Corey M. Gray
- makoyiʔsokoo
- Born: 1972 or 1973 (age 53–54)
- Education: Humboldt State University (BS) 1997; California State University, San Bernardino
- Employer: California Institute of Technology
- Known for: Detecting gravitational waves; Scientific Blackfoot language translations
- Awards: Breakthrough Prize in Fundamental Physics; Paul F. Forman Team Engineering Excellence Award

Corey Gray (Blackfoot: makoyiʔsokoo or Wolf's Path, born 1972 or 1973) is a Native American physicist and science communicator. He is a lead operator of LIGO in Hanford, Washington. He was among the first to detect gravitational waves, for which he and his team won a Breakthrough Prize in Fundamental Physics and a Paul F. Forman Team Engineering Excellence Award in 2016. Gray and his team were publicly acknowledged by the three Nobel Prize in Physics laureates in 2017 for the discovery.

Gray is a member of Siksika Nation and was honored with a Headdress in 2024 for his work in physics and for translating scientific publications into the Blackfoot language with his mother.

== Education and personal life ==
Gray is the son of Sharon Yellowfly, who was raised on the Blackfoot Indian Reservation and is a survivor of the Crowfoot Residential School, and Tom K. Gray, an engineer of Scottish ancestry. He grew up in San Bernardino, California, where Yellowfly studied anthropology at California State University (CSU). As a child and member of the Siksika Nation, he was given the Blackfoot name agabo?suyis ("Many Weaseltails"). While in high school, Gray watched the MacGyver TV series and dreamed of becoming the "Siksika MacGyver".

Originally unsure what to study, Gray enrolled as an undeclared major at the CSU in his hometown. He then transferred to Humboldt State University (HSU), where he joined the Indian Natural Resources Science and Engineering Program. While an undergraduate student, Gray participated in research at the SLAC National Accelerator Laboratory, the United States Department of Energy, and at the University of California, San Francisco. He was awarded with dual Bachelor of Science degrees in Physics and Applied mathematics in 1997. HSU honored him with a distinguished alumni award in 2018.

== Career ==
After seeing an ad in the Los Angeles Times for a position at the new Laser Interferometer Gravitational-Wave Observatory (LIGO) in Eastern Washington, Gray decided to apply for the job. He said his experience in undergraduate research caught the attention of the hiring managers. He moved to Richland, Washington, and joined the California Institute of Technology in March 1998 just after construction was completed at the Hanford, Washington, site. Gray's first position on the team was working on the seismic isolation system, which included the installation of the large optical tables that support and isolate the interferometer’s mirrors from ground motion. It became operational in 2002, at which time Gray and his team became responsible for observation and maintaining the subsystems. He was honored with a Caltech Service Award for his decade of work in 2008. As of 2025, he was a lead operator.

Gray was a senior operator who detected the first gravitational waves at LIGO in 2015, which for the first time validated Albert Einstein's prediction of their existence through general relativity with direct observation. For this, Gray and his teammates were awarded the Breakthrough Prize in Fundamental Physics and the Paul F. Forman Team Engineering Excellence Award in 2016. In 2017, Rainer Weiss, Barry Barish, and Kip Thorne were awarded a Nobel Prize in Physics for their contributions toward the discovery. Weiss, et al., unsuccessfully attempted to persuade the committee to honor Gray and the rest of the collaborators for their contributions.

== Indigenous science communication ==
Upon the first detection of gravitational waves at LIGO, Gray proposed the press release, which had been prepared in many global languages, he proposed also translating it into the Blackfoot language, which was his mother's first language. Prior to this translation, there were no pre-existing terms in Blackfoot for modern astrophysics concepts. While some terms, like "black hole" (sigooxga) and "chirp" (biixiini’gi) could be translated directly, others required neologisms. Some of the Blackfoot terms Gray and his mother coined were Abuduuxbiisiiya o?bigimskAAsts ("stick-together waves") for gravitational waves, bisaatsinsiimaan for Einstein’s general theory of relativity ("beautiful plantings"), and Anatsiwayagidutsim gii idumuya issxgwibiists ("light-splitter and marry/union measurements") for interferometer.

Gray and his mother have produced further Blackfoot translations of additional LIGO documents and materials, including the seminal research paper, and presented the work to various universities. Some of the translations were published on YouTube by Symmetry and Gray published the full 2016 press release on his own account. In 2017, their family hosted a traditional grass dance contest at a Powwow themed around celebrating the discovery of gravitational waves. They are a part of a revival project of the Blackfoot language, including the creation of a dictionary. Gray engages in outreach efforts, encouraging Indigenous youth to enter into science, technology, engineering, and mathematics. He said that he is very introverted, but engages in outreach to Indigenous youth so they don't feel so isolated.

In June 2024, Gray was honored by the Siksika Nation with a traditional Blackfoot Headdress, the highest honor in his culture for his work as a scientist and as a cultural ambassador of First Nations People. Prior to the ceremony, the Blackfoot name he was given as a child was replaced when he was given the name maguyuʔsuguu (‘Wolf’s Path’), a reference to the Blackfoot tradition in which the Milky Way is the path that wolves took down to Earth to help humans.

== Awards and honors ==
- Caltech Service Award, California Institute of Technology, 2008
- Breakthrough Prize in Fundamental Physics, 2016
- Paul F. Forman Team Engineering Excellence Award, 2016
- Distinguished Alumni Award, Humboldt State University, 2018
- Sharon Yellowfly Fellowship, Society of Indigenous Physicists, 2023
- Blackfoot Headdress Ceremony, Siksika Nation, 2024
