= Making Treaty 7 =

Arts collective in Calgary, Canada

Making Treaty 7 is an arts collective that stemmed from the Calgary's nomination as one of the Cultural Capitals of Canada in 2012. The collective seeks to draw attention on the creation of Treaty 7 and its continuing effects on Indigenous populations of Alberta, in hopes of dispelling misunderstandings, myths and falsities that originate from a lack of awareness. The collective produces works of art and theatre projects to encourage greater attention to this ongoing dialogue. It has been described by CTV News as "one of the city's – and the country's – most important companies."

== Formation ==
Making Treaty 7 was created as a part of the Calgary 2012 winning bid for the Cultural Capitals of Canada project. When Calgary 2012 finished its run, Making Treaty 7 filed for non-profit status and has continued to host events, put on theatre productions and educate the public on Indigenous affairs, human rights issues and the culture and identity of historic and present Indigenous peoples.

== Mandate ==
Making Treaty 7 is a not-for-profit organization that implements various methods to improve the public's appreciation for First Nations culture, identity and diversity. Making Treaty 7 uses several artistic mediums to educate people, entice more tourism, and accentuate cultural understanding.

== Membership ==
Board of directors: Dr. Andrew Bear Robe (board chair, Siksika Nation), Kelli Morning Bull (vice chair, Piikani Nation), Dr. Genevieve Fox (treasurer, Kainaiwa Nation), Carol Mason (secretary, Kainaiwa Nation), Joyce Doore (director, Siksika Nation), Autumn Eagle Speaker (director, Kainaiwa), Hal Eagletail (director, Tsuut'ina Nation), Amanda Foote (director), Rebekah Whitely (director).

Team Members: Justiny Many Fingers (artistic director), Oli Siska (managing director), Sue Scott (Project Manager), Nora Dubois (Office Administrator).

== Events ==
Making Treaty 7 Cultural Festival is an annual festival to celebrate Indigenous creatives and art. It hosts a historic recreation of the signing of Treaty 7 and then carries on the narrative to present day experience.

150 Acts of Reconciliation, before the 150th anniversary of Canada, members of Making Treaty 7 wrote a list of 150 actions that would allow for a greater understanding between cultures.

Making Treaty 7 Vignettes, a compilation of scenes from Making Treaty 7 that express human rights issues experienced because of the ramifications faced by the Indigenous peoples of Treaty 7.

A visual arts exhibit was first held in September 2018, showcasing pieces created by Indigenous artists. The following year, Making Treaty 7 hosted another art exhibition, where "[m]any local indigenous artists were there to display and speak about their work to Calgarians".

== Theatre productions ==
The 2018 production of Kaahsinnoniks (Our Ancestors) revisited the signing of Treaty 7 and emphasized the fundamental ideas that it proposed and followed up with the realities faced by the Indigenous nations that signed it.

The 2018 production of Kiitistsinnoniks (Our Mothers) told stories of several Indigenous women both past and present. With an all-female cast and crew, Making Treaty 7 described this production as in solidarity with missing and murdered Indigenous women and girls around Canada.

== Partnerships and funding ==
=== Indigenous community partners ===
- Treaty 7 Management Corporation
- Aboriginal Friendship Centre of Calgary
- Native Centre at University of Calgary
- Aboriginal Futures Career & Training Centre
- Alberta Aboriginal Arts

==== Non-indigenous community partners ====
- Banff Centre
- One Yellow Rabbit
- Heritage Park
- Alberta Theatre Projects
- Fort Calgary
- Glenbow Museum
- Suncor, RBC.

==== Government and public funding ====
- Alberta Aboriginal Relations
- Alberta Culture
- Alberta Foundation for the Arts
- Alberta Human Rights Commission
- Alberta Tourism- Parks and Recreation
- Calgary 2012
- Calgary Arts Development
- The Calgary Foundation
- Canada Council for the Arts
- Canadian Heritage.

== See also ==
- Treaty 7
- Blackfoot Crossing
- Alberta Theatre Projects
- Missing and murdered Indigenous women
