= Maggie Black Kettle =

Canadian actress and community leader

- Maggie Black Kettle, from a 1988 newspaper
- Born: August 20, 1917; Siksika Reserve, Alberta, Canada
- Died: September 14, 2011; Calgary, Alberta, Canada
- Other names: Maggie Blackkettle, Niinayiiniimakii
- Occupation(s): Community leader, educator, storyteller, dancer, artist

Maggie Black Kettle (August 20, 1917 – September 14, 2011) was a Canadian community leader in the Siksika Nation. She taught traditional crafts, dance, and the Blackfoot language in Calgary. She was a storyteller, and appeared in film and television programs in her later years.

== Early life ==
Black Kettle was born in the Siksika First Nations Reserve near Gleichen, Alberta. At age 7, she was enrolled at a Catholic boarding school in Cluny, where she was forbidden to speak Blackfoot, her only language as a child.

== Career ==
Black Kettle was considered a matriarch and spiritual leader of the Siksika people. She attended community events, including local ceremonies, large North American powwows, and the Indian Village exhibition at the annual Calgary Stampede. She taught the Blackfoot language and traditional crafts and dances at the Plains Indian Cultural Survival School, and at the Piitoayis Family School, both in Calgary. During the 1988 Winter Olympics in Calgary, Black Kettle shared her weather forecasts for the event. The following year, she cofounded the city's Native Awareness Week. She served on the board of the Calgary Indian Friendship Centre, and assisted First Nations women who were new to the city. She was recognized with a Woman of Distinction Award from the YWCA of Calgary in 1994. She was a member of the Sundance Society Motookiiks, the Buffalo Women's Society, and the Horn Society.

Black Kettle was a storyteller in her later years, and appeared in Canadian film and television shows, including roles in North of 60 (1993), Medicine River (1993), Wild America (1997), and Dream Storm (2001).

== Personal life ==
When she was 16 years old, she married Nickolas Black Kettle, in an arranged union. They ran a farm together, and had seven children. She also raised some of her many grandchildren. She was widowed when her husband died in 1973, and she died in 2011, aged 94 years, at a hospital in Calgary.
