= James Gladstone =

Canadian politician (1887–1971)

The Honourable James Gladstone
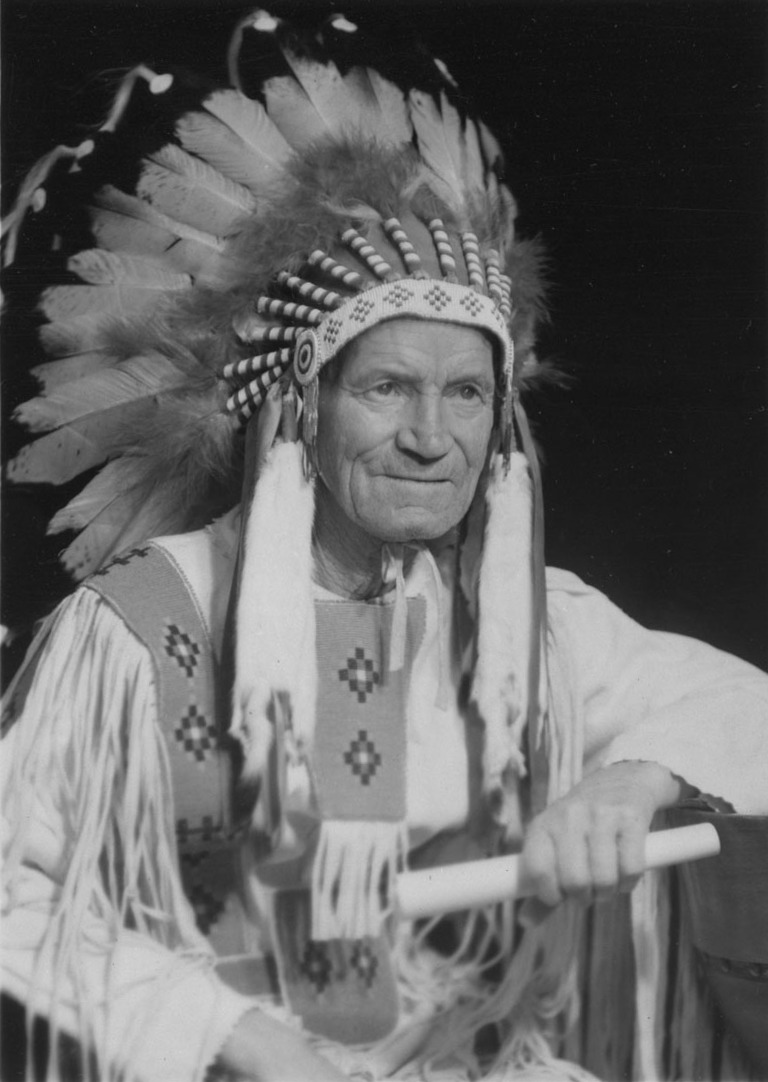
- Senator Gladstone, c. 1958

Canadian Senator from Alberta
- In office January 31, 1958 – March 31, 1971

Personal details
- Born: May 21, 1887 Mountain Mill, Northwest Territories, Canada
- Died: September 4, 1971 (aged 84) Fernie, British Columbia, Canada
- Party: Independent Conservative

James Gladstone (Blackfoot: Akay-na-muka, lit. 'Many Guns'; May 21, 1887 – September 4, 1971) was a Canadian politician recognized by the Library of Parliament as first Treaty Indian to be appointed to the Senate of Canada.

== Early life ==
James Gladstone was of mixed racial ancestry. The future senator was not born First Nations and only became a status Indian at the age of 33, when in 1920 his wife's family petitioned the government for his inclusion on the Indian registry. His maternal grandfather, in fact, was a Scottish-Canadian, born in Montreal in 1832, who entered the service of the Hudson's Bay Company at the age of sixteen. While in the North-West Territories, William Shanks Gladstone married Harriet Leblanc, a Métis of Cree, Santee Sioux, and French Canadian heritage. One of their six children who survived to adulthood was Harriet (named after her mother), who was born at Rocky Mountain House in 1859. Harriet led a rough and unsteady life. After several years spent with a rough crowd of Métis and white frontiersmen, she formed a long-term relationship with a white lumber-mill foreman. Their union broke down, however, in the mid-1890s, and Harriet was left to raise skinny Jimmy, a boy with brown hair and blue eyes on her own. He was one of four children born to Harriet.

He attended St. Paul's Indian Residential School, because his Grandfather and local Anglican minister felt he would be fed, clothed, educated and spiritually looked after. He attended an Anglican mission school on the Blood reserve until 1903, when he moved to an Indian Industrial school (St Dunstans) in Calgary and apprenticed as a printer, interning at The Calgary Herald.

== Career ==
After leaving school in 1905, Gladstone returned to the Blood reserve where he worked as an interpreter. He also found work on ranches wrangling cattle. In 1911, he found work with the Royal North-West Mounted Police as a scout and interpreter and also worked as a mail carrier on the reserve. He is also reported as being a typesetter at one time at the Calgary Herald.

He was married to Blood member Janie Healy. After his marriage he was registered a member of the Blood reserve. Eventually, Gladstone established himself as a farmer and successful rancher (with 720 acres under cultivation and a herd of 400 Hereford cattle in 1958) and worked with his sons to assemble the 400 head of cattle and introducing modern farming practices to the reserve, including first use of a tractor in 1920.

In 1949, Gladstone was elected president of the Indian Association of Alberta though another source records his presidency as 1945–1954, and was sent to Ottawa three times to press for improvements to the Indian Act. His acceptance by both Blackfoot and Cree assisted him in bringing the different groups together in one political organization.

== Senate appointment ==
He was nominated to the Senate by Progressive Conservative Prime Minister John Diefenbaker in January 1958, at age 70. With his time in office, he fought for Aboriginals to be enfranchised, including status Indians right to vote in federal elections without loss of ‘Indian rights’ (achieved in 1960), better education for status Indians, equal liquor rights (at the time, it was illegal for status holders to drink). He sat as an "independent Conservative" "representing 160,000 Indians across the land." He advocated for integration into Canadian society, such as allowing status-holders to attend post-secondary school with white students. He was the chair of the Standing Committee on Indian Affairs. To meet the property qualifications for the Senate "he drove with his wife to nearby Cardston and paid cash for a five-room bungalow."

== Retirement and death ==
Gladstone retired from the Senate in March 1971 and died of a heart attack on September 4, 1971, in Fernie, British Columbia.

== Posthumous recognition ==
A biography of Senator Jim Gladstone, written by Alberta historian (and Gladstone's son-in-law) Hugh Dempsey, is entitled The Gentle Persuader.

In 2017, the Bank of Canada unveiled a commemorative Canadian ten-dollar note in honour of Canada 150, featuring Gladstone's portrait alongside Sir John A. Macdonald, Sir George-Étienne Cartier, and Agnes Macphail.

Parliament of Canada
Preceded by George Henry Ross	Senator for Alberta; 1958–1971	Succeeded by Bud Olson
