= Amnon Yariv =

Israeli-American professor

- אמנון יריב
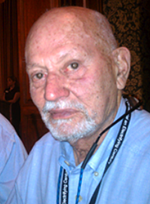
- Professor Amnon Yariv at Caltech in 2010
- Born: April 13, 1930 (age 96); Tel Aviv, British Mandate Palestine
- Known for: Optoelectronics
- Awards: Harold Pender Award (1985); National Medal of Science (2009); IEEE Photonics Award (2011)
- Scientific career
- Fields: Applied physics, electrical engineering
- Institutions: Caltech
- Notable students: Kerry Vahala, Joyce Poon, Avraham Gover

Amnon Yariv (Hebrew: אמנון יריב; born April 13, 1930) is an Israeli-American professor of applied physics and electrical engineering at Caltech, known for innovations in optoelectronics. Yariv obtained his B.S., M.S. and PhD. in electrical engineering from the University of California, Berkeley in 1954, 1956 and 1958, respectively.

== Career ==
In 2010, Yariv was selected as a winner of the National Medal of Science for "scientific and engineering contributions to photonics and quantum electronics that have profoundly impacted lightwave communications and the field of optics as a whole". He has also been selected to receive the IEEE Photonics Award for 2011.

Yariv has been a member of the National Academy of Sciences since 1991. In 1985 he was awarded the Harold Pender Award by the University of Pennsylvania. In 1992 he was awarded the Harvey Prize by the Technion in Haifa, Israel, for "pioneering contributions to opto-electronics, wave propagation in crystals and nonlinear and phase-conjugate optics, and his demonstration of semiconductor-based integrated optics technology leading to the development of high-speed and stable solid-state lasers".

His work has also been recognized by the Optical Society of America. He is a Fellow, and has received the Frederic Ives Medal and Esther Hoffman Beller Medal. In 2017, he was elected an Honorary Member of the Society.

Yariv has authored several texts on optical electronics and photonics. He has said that the highlight of his group's work was the invention of the semiconductor distributed feedback laser, a device widely used in the Internet's fiber-optic communications.

== Personal life ==
Amnon Yariv currently resides in Pasadena, California. He was married to Frances Yariv (deceased March 2025). He has three daughters: Danielle Yariv, Dana Yariv and Gabriela (Gavi) Yariv.
