= Stephen Boppart =

American bioengineer and academic

Professor Stephen A. Boppart Ph.D., M.D.
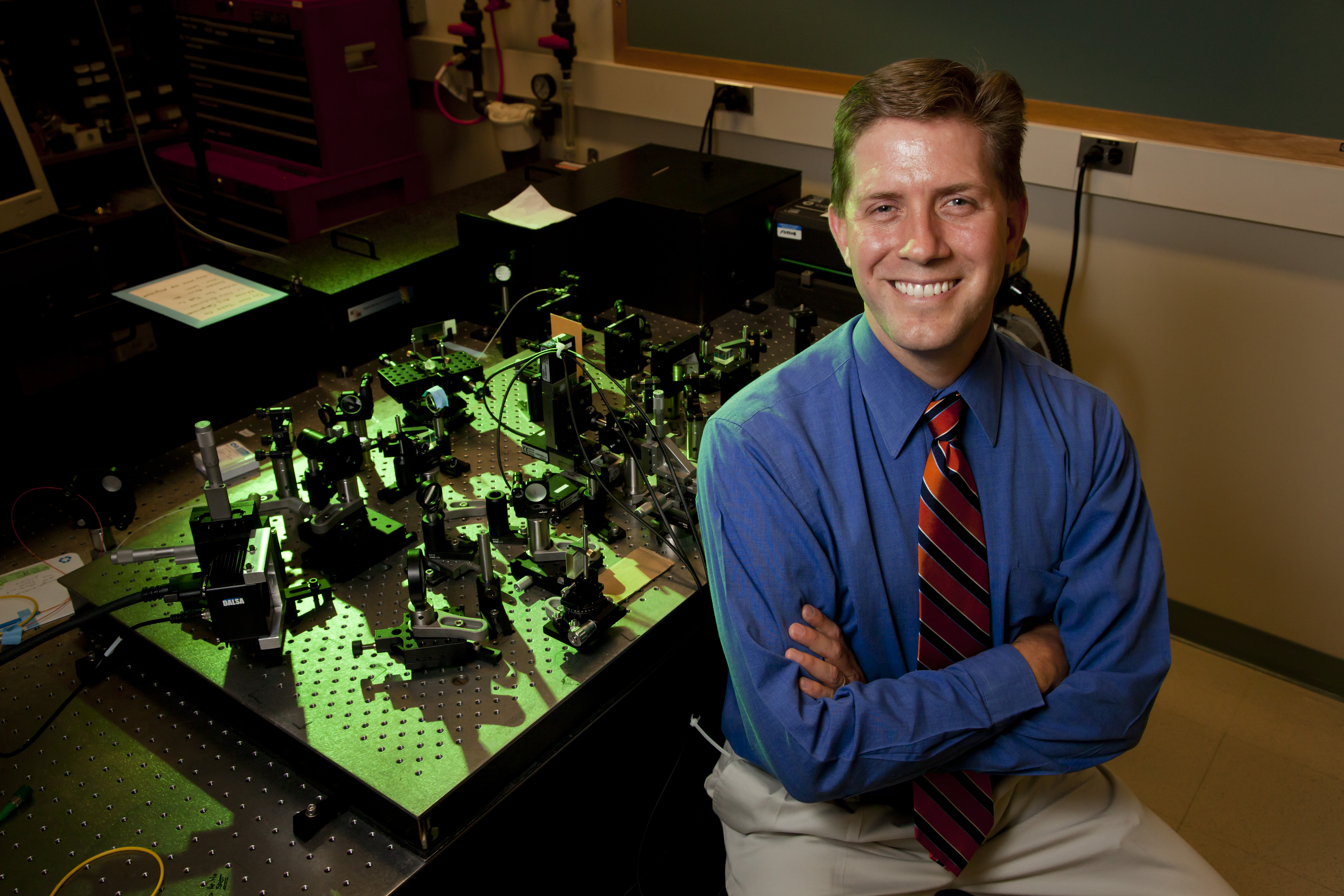
- Professor Stephen Boppart sitting in front of optical table in the Optical Coherence Technology (OCT) laboratory at the Beckman Institute for Advance Science and Technology on the University of Illinois Urbana-Champaign campus
- Born: 1968 (age 57–58); Harvard, Illinois
- Education: University of Illinois at Urbana-Champaign (B.S.)(M.S.); Massachusetts Institute of Technology (Ph.D.); Harvard Medical School (M.D.)
- Awards: Soma Weiss Biomedical Research Award (1999); Technology Review Magazine Top 100 Young Innovators (2002); NSF Career Award (2004); Paul F. Forman Engineering Excellence Award (2011); Abel Bliss Professorship in Engineering (2011); Hans Sigrist Prize (2012)
- Scientific career
- Fields: Biophotonics
- Workplaces: Beckman Institute for Advanced Science and Technology; University of Illinois at Urbana-Champaign; Carle Foundation Hospital
- Thesis: Surgical diagnostics, guidance, and intervention using optical coherence tomography (1998)
- Doctoral advisor: James Fujimoto
- Other academic advisors: Bruce Wheeler
- Website: biophotonics.illinois.edu

Stephen A. Boppart is a principal investigator at the Beckman Institute for Advanced Science and Technology at the University of Illinois at Urbana-Champaign, where he holds an Abel Bliss Professorship in engineering. He is a faculty member in the departments of electrical and computer engineering, bioengineering, and internal medicine. His research focus is biophotonics, where he has pioneered new optical imaging technologies in the fields of optical coherence tomography, multi-photon microscopy, and computational imaging.

== Background and education ==
Boppart was born in the small farming community of Harvard, Illinois. In 1990, he received his B.S. degree from the University of Illinois at Urbana-Champaign (UIUC) in electrical engineering, with an option in bioengineering. In 1991, he received his M.S. degree in electrical engineering from UIUC. His master's research involved the development of multielectrode arrays under Professor Bruce Wheeler. From 1991 to 1993, he developed national laser safety standards at the Air Force Research Laboratory in San Antonio, Texas. He then returned to graduate school to pursue both the Ph.D. and M.D. degrees under a joint program between the Massachusetts Institute of Technology (MIT) and Harvard Medical School. He received his Ph.D. in medical and electrical engineering in 1998 under the direction of James Fujimoto, and completed his M.D. in 2000. While at MIT, he was involved in the invention and early development of optical coherence tomography (OCT).

== Research ==
Boppart started the Biophotonics Imaging Laboratory at UIUC in 2000, an interdisciplinary research group working at the intersection of engineering, medicine, and biology. The research focuses on the development of biophotonics for translational medicine in primary care and oncology. Building upon the development of OCT in his graduate studies, Boppart expanded OCT to new application areas. OCT was used to image the tympanic membrane (eardrum) to determine the presence of biofilm, a complicating factor in ear infections. He also developed OCT for intraoperative breast cancer imaging to determine the status of the resection margin.

At UIUC, his research interests expanded to include nonlinear optical microscopy. He developed nonlinear interferometric vibrational imaging, a variation of CARS microscopy, for imaging cancer resection margins. He also pioneered multimodal-multiphoton microscopy, the combination of several nonlinear optical imaging modalities into a single imaging system. These nonlinear optical imaging technologies were enabled by the development of an optical fiber-based supercontinuum laser source. In 2017, Boppart demonstrated coherent control of neurons.

Boppart applied computational imaging to coherent optical microscopy by solving the inverse problem for OCT. This allows for three-dimensional imaging with extended depth-of-field and digital correction of optical aberrations.

== Administration and entrepreneurship ==
From 2006 to 2008, Boppart was the founding director of the Mills Breast Cancer Institute at Carle Foundation Hospital. In 2011, he headed the Strategic Initiative on Imaging at UIUC. He was also heavily involved in the founding of the engineering-based Carle Illinois College of Medicine in 2015.

Multiple startup companies have been formed from Boppart's research. In 2011, Diagnostic Photonics, Inc. was launched which develops a handheld probe for imaging the breast cancer resection margin. In 2013, PhotoniCare was formed to commercialize a handheld probe for imaging biofilms in the middle ear.

== Awards and honors ==
- SPIE, Biophotonics Technology Innovator Award, 2019
- Massachusetts Institute of Technology, Technology Review Top 100 Young Innovators Award
- National Science Foundation Career Award
- Hans Sigrist Prize, 2012
- Abel Bliss Professorship in Engineering, 2011
- Paul F. Forman Team Engineering Excellence Award, 2009
- Fellow, Optical Society of America
- Fellow, SPIE
- Fellow, Institute of Electrical and Electronics Engineers
- Fellow, American Association for the Advancement of Science
- Fellow, American Institute for Medical and Biological Engineering
- Fellow, Biomedical Engineering Society
