= Hugh Dempsey =

Canadian historian (1929–2022)

- Born: Hugh Aylmer Dempsey; November 7, 1929; Edgerton, Alberta
- Died: May 24, 2022 (aged 92); Calgary
- Occupations: Historian; Author
- Spouse: Pauline Gladstone
- Writing career
- Genre: Historical
- Subjects: First Nation; Alberta
- Notable awards: Order of Canada

Hugh Aylmer Dempsey, CM (November 7, 1929 - May 24, 2022) was a Canadian historian, an author and the Chief Curator Emeritus of the Glenbow Museum in Calgary, Alberta. Dempsey authored more than 20 books, focusing primarily on the history of people of the Blackfoot Confederacy. He received an honorary doctorate from the University of Calgary and was made an honorary chief of the Kainai Blackfoot in 1967. For his contributions to the study of the Plains Indians, Dempsey was awarded membership in the Order of Canada in 1975.

== Career ==
Dempsey left school in 1947 after completing Grade 11. He worked as a journalist for the Edmonton Bulletin newspaper from 1948 to 1951 and then, when the newspaper folded, became a publicity writer for the Alberta Government from 1951 to 1956. In 1956, Dempsey was vice-president of the Edmonton-based Historical Society of Alberta and associate editor of the Alberta Historical Review, when he moved to Calgary to become archivist of the recently established Glenbow Museum. From 1956 until 1967, he served as archivist, becoming curator/director from 1967 to 1991. On his retirement Dempsey was made Chief Curator Emeritus.

Dempsey authored numerous articles and books, such as Crowfoot, Chief of the Blackfeet (1973), The Gentle Persuader: A Biography of James Gladstone, Indian Senator (1986), and Red Crow: Warrior Chief (1978), which focus on the culture and history of the First Nation peoples of Alberta. Dempsey's writing benefited not only from his work as an archivist but also from his access to the Blackfoot community through his marriage. Dempsey is credited with combining the oral history of native peoples with scholarly records to produce historical writing with a broad popular appeal.

Dempsey became editor of the Alberta Historical Review in 1958. From 1963 to 1967, Dempsey was also editor of the newsletter The Canadian Archivist which later became the journal of the Archives Section of the Canadian Historical Association. He also lectured on native studies and Alberta history at the University of Calgary.

== Honors ==
Dempsey was the honorary secretary of the Indian Association of Alberta from 1959 to 1964 and was made an honorary chief of the Kainai Nation in 1967. Dempsey was presented with an honorary doctorate from the University of Calgary on May 30, 1974, after he gave the convocation address. On October 15, 1975 Dempsey was invested as a Member of the Order of Canada "for his contributions to the preservation of the cultural and development of interest in the history of the Plains Indians." In 1987, Dempsey was awarded the Certificate of Merit in Regional History by the Canadian Historical Association for his "distinguished career." On October 2, 2000, the Archives Society of Alberta paid tribute to Dempsey "for his lasting contributions" to the preservation of Alberta's heritage. In 2019, Dempsey received an honorary degree from the University of Lethbridge.

== Personal life ==
Dempsey was born in Edgerton, Alberta in 1929. His parents were English war bride Lily Louise Sharp and farmer (former Canadian soldier) Otto Lionel Dempsey. Forced off the land by the Depression, they moved to Edmonton when Hugh was five. In 1953 he married Pauline Gladstone, the daughter of Canadian Senator James Gladstone of the Kainai Blackfoot, with whom he had five children. In 1951 Dempsey began more than 40 years of correspondence and friendship with American ethnohistorian John Canfield Ewers when the two met while doing field research on the Blackfoot reservation in Montana.

Dempsey died in Calgary, Alberta, on May 24, 2022, at the age of 92.

== Bibliography ==
=== Selected books ===
- Crowfoot, Chief of the Blackfeet, (The Civilization of the American Indian Series, v. 122), Norman: University of Oklahoma Press, 1972. ISBN 0-8061-1025-2
- Red Crow, Warrior Chief, Lincoln: University of Nebraska Press, 1980. ISBN 0-8032-1657-2
- Indian Tribes of Alberta, Calgary: Glenbow-Alberta Institute, 1979. ISBN 0-919224-00-8
- History in their Blood : The Indian Portraits of Nicholas de Grandmaison, Vancouver: Douglas & McIntyre, 1982. ISBN 0-933920-32-6
- (editor) The CPR West: The Iron Road and the Making of a Nation, Vancouver: Douglas and McIntyre, 1984. ISBN 0-88894-424-1
- Big Bear : The End of Freedom', Vancouver: Douglas & McIntyre, 1984. ISBN 0-88894-506-X
- Gentle Persuader : A Biography of James Gladstone, Indian Senator, Saskatoon : Western Producer Prairie Books, 1986. ISBN 0-88833-208-4
- Bibliography of the Blackfoot, (with Lindsay Moir), Native American bibliography series, no. 13. Metuchen, NJ: Scarecrow Press, 1989. ISBN 0-8108-2211-3
- The Amazing Death of Calf Shirt and Other Blackfoot Stories: Three Hundred years of Blackfoot History, Norman: University of Oklahoma Press, 1996. ISBN 0-8061-2821-6
- Tom Three Persons: Legend of an Indian Cowboy, Saskatoon: Purich Publishing Ltd, 1997. ISBN 1-895830-08-7
- Charcoal's World: The True Story of a Canadian Indian's Last Stand, Calgary: Fifth House Publishers, 1998. ISBN 1-894004-20-5
- Firewater: The Impact of the Whisky Trade on the Blackfoot Nation, Calgary: Fifth House Publishers, 2002. ISBN 1-894004-96-5
- The Vengeful Wife and Other Blackfoot Stories, Norman: University Of Oklahoma Press, 2003. ISBN 0-8061-3550-6
- The People of the Buffalo. The Plains Indians of North America. Essays in Honor of John C. Ewers, vol 1 & 2, co-editor with Colin F. Taylor, Wyk auf Foehr, Germany: Tatanka Press, 2003 (vol. 1), 2004 (vol, 2). ISBN 3-89510-101-X (vol.1) 3-89510-102-8 (vol.2)
- Maskepetoon: Leader, Warrior, Peacemaker, Victoria: Heritage House Publishing, 2010. ISBN 978-1-92661-368-0
- The Great Blackfoot Treaties, Victoria: Heritage House Publishing, 2015. ISBN 978-1-77203-078-5
- Napi: The Trickster, Victoria: Heritage House Publishing, 2018. ISBN 978-1-77203-217-8

=== Selected articles and monographs ===
- A Blackfoot Winter Count, Calgary, Glenbow-Alberta Institute, 1965, reprinted 1970. OCLC 605474
- "The Calgary-Edmonton Trail", Alberta Historical Review 7, no. 4 (Autumn 1959).
- "Long Lance, Catawba-Cherokee and adopted Blackfoot", in American Indian intellectuals, Proceedings of the American Ethnological Society, St. Paul : West Pub. Co., 1978.
- "One Hundred Years of Treaty Seven", in One Century Later: Western Canadian Reserve Indians since Treaty 7, Vancouver: University of British Columbia Press, 1977.
- "History and Identification of Blood Bands." in Plains Indian Studies: A Collection of Essays in honor of John C. Ewers and Waldo R. Wedel, Washington, DC: Smithsonian Institution Press, 1982.
- "Blackfoot Ghost Dance", Occasional paper, no. 3. Calgary, Alberta: Glenbow Museum, 1989.
- Tribal Honors: A History of the Kainai Chieftainship, Calgary, AB, Canada : Kainai Chieftainship, 1997. ISBN 0-919555-10-1
- "Blood (Kainai)", Canadian Encyclopedia, Toronto: Historical Foundation of Canada, 2005.
- "Beginnings of Calgary: The Isaac S. Freeze Letters 1883–84." Alberta History --. 51. 1 (2003).
