= Kerry Vahala =

American professor of Applied Physics at the California Institute of Technology

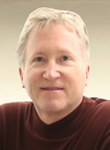
- Vahala in 2020
- Born: February 5, 1959 (age 67); Flint, Michigan
- Education: California Institute of Technology (BS, MS, PhD)
- Spouse: Karen
- Awards: Humboldt Prize; IEEE David Sarnoff Award; Paul F. Forman Team Engineering Excellence Award
- Scientific career
- Fields: optical microcavities
- Workplaces: California Institute of Technology
- Thesis: Dynamic and Spectral Features of Semiconductor Lasers (1985)
- Doctoral advisor: Amnon Yariv

Kerry J. Vahala is an American professor of Applied Physics at the California Institute of Technology (Caltech). He holds the Ted and Ginger Jenkins chair of Information Science and Technology and also serves as the Executive Officer of the Department of Applied Physics and Materials Science.

== Early life and education ==
Kerry John Vahala was born in Flint, Michigan, on February 5, 1959, to Ernest and Joyce Vahala. Ernest was an automotive engineer at General Motors. He received his B.S. and Ph.D. degrees in Applied Physics and an M.S. degree in Electrical Engineering, all from Caltech. His doctoral advisor was Amnon Yariv.

== Career ==
Vahala is known for his studies of devices called optical microcavities and their application to a wide range of subjects including miniature frequency and time systems, microwave sources, parametric oscillators, astrocombs and gyroscopes. He also made early contributions to the subject of cavity optomechanics and was involved in demonstrations of chip-based devices to cavity QED phenomena.

Vahala is a Fellow of the IEEE and the Optical Society of America, has received an Alexander von Humboldt Award for his work on high-Q optical microcavities, an award from NASA for work on Astrocombs, the Paul F Forman Team Engineering Excellence Award from the Optical Society for the '2-photon optical clock collaboration', and is a member of the National Academy of Engineering. He also contributed to the understanding of quantum well lasers for optical communications, and shared with Y. Arakawa and K. Lau the 2009 IEEE David Sarnoff Award for research on quantum-well laser dynamics. Their "combined work formed the basis for nearly all of today’s high-speed semiconductor laser design for lightwave high-speed telecommunications, particularly in the metropolitan and local-area arena”.

Vahala has also received the National Science Foundation Presidential Young Investigator Award, the ONR Young Investigator Award, and was the first recipient of Caltech's Feynman Hughes Fellowship.

Vahala has served as associate editor to both Photonics Technology Letters and the Journal of the Optical Society of America, is on the advisory board of APL Photonics, and was Program Chair and General Chair for the Conference on Lasers and Electro-Optics (CLEO) in 2000 and 2001.

== Later life ==
His daughter Katelyn is an international prize-winning pianist and a USC faculty member.
