= Crowfoot =

First Nations chief in Canada (1830–1890)

- Isapo-Muxika / Issapóómahksika / ᖱᓭᑲᒉᖽᐧᖿᖷ
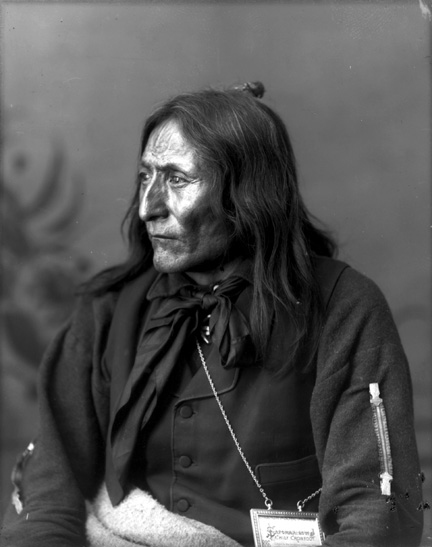
- Chief Crowfoot ca. 1885
- Born: c. 1830; Rupert's Land
- Died: 25 April 1890 (aged 59–60); Blackfoot Crossing, North-West Territories
- Other names: Shot-Close (baby name); Bear Ghost (boy name); Packs a Knife (former warrior name)
- Known for: Chief of the Siksika First Nation, warrior, peacemaker
- Title: Chief of Siksika First Nation 1890
- Parents: Istowun-ehʼpata (father); Axkahp-say-pi (mother)
- Relatives: Iron Shield (brother); Three Bulls (adopted brother); Scabby Bull (grandfather); Crying Bear (uncle)

Crowfoot (or Isapo-Muxika Blackfoot: Issapóómahksika; syllabics: ᖱᓭᑲᒉᖽᐧᖿᖷ lit. 'Crow-big-foot' c. 1830 – 25 April 1890) was a chief of the Siksika. His father, Istowun-ehʼpata (Packs a Knife), and mother, Axkahp-say-pi (Attacked Towards Home), were Kainai. He was five years old when Istowun-ehʼpata was killed during a raid on the Crow tribe, and, a year later, his mother remarried to Akay-nehka-simi (Many Names) of the Siksika people among whom he was brought up. Crowfoot was a warrior who fought in as many as nineteen battles and sustained many injuries, but he tried to obtain peace instead of warfare. Crowfoot is well known for his involvement in Treaty Number 7 and did much negotiating for his people. While many believe Chief Crowfoot had no part in the North-West Rebellion, he did in fact participate to an extent due to his son's connection to the conflict. Crowfoot died of tuberculosis at Blackfoot Crossing on April 25, 1890. Eight hundred of his tribe attended his funeral, along with government dignitaries. In 2008, Chief Crowfoot was inducted into the North America Railway Hall of Fame where he was recognized for his contributions to the railway industry. Crowfoot is well known for his contributions to the Blackfoot nation, and has many memorials to signify his accomplishments.

== Early life ==
Chief Crowfoot was born in 1830 to the Kainai, known to traders and settlers as the Bloods, one of the tribes of the Blackfoot Confederacy. His father was Istowun-ehʼpata (Packs a Knife) and his mother was Axkahp-say-pi (Attacked Towards Home). He was first known as Shot-Close. Later as a boy, he was given the name Bear Ghost and then his father's name Packs a Knife, after he had been killed by members of the Crow tribe. These different names came at different times in his life as he proved himself a skilled Blackfoot warrior and, later, chief. A year after his father died, his mother remarried a member of the Siksika tribe, Akay-nehka-simi (Many Names), who eventually brought his new wife back to his tribe. Crowfoot followed his new father and mother to the Siksika on foot for several hours, eventually causing the two to turn around and bring both the young Crowfoot and his grandfather Scabby Bull with them to the Blackfoot tribe. It was with this tribe where Crowfoot proved himself as a warrior and leader.

== Leadership of the Siksika Nation ==
Crowfoot's bravery and determination earned him respect from fellow Blackfoot, but it was his skills as a voice of peace and reason that made him one of the most respected Canadian natives when he rose to become one of the leaders of the Blackfoot nation. Crowfoot was often called Manistokos, which means 'father of the people', because of his caring nature in regards to his tribe members. He was known to provide food to those who needed it in his tribe.

Crowfoot worked hard to build relations between the Blackfoot and the agents of different organizations that came into their lands, such as the Hudson's Bay Company and the North-West Mounted Police (NWMP). This effort by Crowfoot sometimes led him to come into conflict with other members of his nation, such as when he stopped a group of Blackfoot warriors from raiding a Hudson's Bay caravan.

Late in 1866 he prevented a number of Blackfoot warriors from looting a train of Hudson's Bay Company carts and killing its Métis drivers. Then, defying a number of warrior chiefs, he provided a safe escort for the Métis back to Fort Edmonton. He also became a good friend of HBC trader Richard Charles Hardisty who was in charge of Rocky Mountain House.

Crowfoot had interactions with another famous chief, Sitting Bull. These interactions occurred when the Blackfoot moved south following the disappearing bison herds. When the Blackfoot arrived in Sioux territory, Sitting Bull invited Crowfoot to combine their strength and fight against both the United States and the NWMP. Crowfoot refused this offer, understanding that his people and the Sioux together were not strong enough to stand for long against the strength of the United States military and the Canadian government. Eventually, Crowfoot led the Blackfoot back into Canadian territory, leaving on bad terms with Sitting Bull. When the Sioux came into Canada, fleeing pursuing American forces, Crowfoot made peace with Sitting Bull and his tribe. This helped protect the Sioux from pursuing American forces for a time, but eventually economic factors forced the Blackfoot to push the police to force the Sioux back into the United States.

== Family ==
Crowfoot had a total of 10 wives throughout his life, but never more than four at a time. His first wife was named Cutting Woman, and she was favoured over the other wives. Crowfoot had many children with his wives, but only four of them lived to adulthood: one son, who was blind, and three daughters. At one point Crowfoot had a son that showed potential as a warrior and leader but he was killed in his early teenage years in a battle against the Cree. Crowfoot vowed to avenge the death of his son and personally led a raid against a nearby Cree camp to kill one Cree tribe member. During the raid, the Blackfoot captured a young Cree man, who bore a resemblance to Crowfoot's dead son. Crowfoot adopted the young man. Later this Cree man returned to his people and became the chief Poundmaker.

== North-West Rebellion ==
In 1885 Louis Riel returned to Canada after spending several years in the United States in exile. In what is now Saskatchewan, he created a Métis provisional government after rising tensions between the West and Ottawa. The creation of this provisional government and their demands for a Métis land is what eventually led to the North-West Rebellion. This rebellion was composed primarily of Métis supporters, but it also had some support from local tribes who had grown resentful of the incursions by settlers onto their lands and who feared that their people would be swallowed by the influx of people from the East. These rebels hoped to gain the support of the powerful Blackfoot nation to defeat the settlers and the coming Canadian Militia.

During the North-West Rebellion Crowfoot removed himself and his people from the fighting for as long as possible. He knew that the rebel fighters were fighting a losing battle, but on the other hand his adopted son Poundmaker was deeply involved in the conflict. Crowfoot was also aware of the fact that the Blackfoot were not treated much better by the Métis who were then fighting the Canadian government.

While the rebellion was ongoing, agents from both sides of the conflict sought to gain the support of the Blackfoot nation. It was mainly due to the respect the warriors of the nation gave Crowfoot that they followed his instruction to not become involved in the fighting.

However, after much debate Crowfoot did choose to back the Crown, though he continued to remain as removed as he could. Despite his agreement with the Crown he allowed Cree refugees into his camp during the rebellion. Due to Crowfoot's hesitancy to be involved in the rebellion, the loyalty of the Blackfoot nation was questioned. Crowfoot's involvement in the rebellion was centred entirely on his loyalty to the Blackfoot tribe.

== After the rebellion ==
At the end of the rebellion Poundmaker was in jail and set to go to trial in Regina. Crowfoot sent Lieutenant Governor Edgar Dewdney a letter asking him to grant Poundmaker a pardon. Crowfoot's request was denied, and Poundmaker was found guilty and sentenced to serve three years in a penitentiary. He ended up serving only six months and was released at the request of Dewdney. Upon being released Poundmaker returned to visit Crowfoot to reconnect with his adopted father. During this visit he died, potentially as a result of his deteriorating health from his prison stay. This devastated Crowfoot as his only healthy son was dead.

The refusal by Crowfoot to provide aid to the rebellion made the Canadian government regard him as a potentially useful ally for negotiating treaties with the Blackfoot and other First Nations. The treaty that was the most important for Crowfoot and the Blackfoot was called Treaty 7.

== Treaty 7 ==
The main purpose of the treaty from the perspective of the Canadian government was to gain control of the western prairie land and to prevent themselves from being antagonized. They falsely considered Crowfoot to be the leader of the entire Blackfoot Confederation, including the Blood and Northern Piegan, much to the anger of those nations' respective leaders. Crowfoot thus had a greater reputation as a diplomat than these chiefs and though he always made sure they were consulted in making decisions, he did not feel at all uncomfortable playing the role of supreme commander. Commissioner David Laird promised rations of flour, tea, sugar, tobacco and beef to be provided during negotiations, but Crowfoot, skeptical of their intentions, refused them until he had all the terms of the treaty. In return for allowing White settlers to live on their land, they were offered a secured plot of the land, farming implements, cattle, potatoes, five dollars annually and ammunition.

Crowfoot was levelheaded in his consideration of the offerings in the treaty. He did not want to give up land only to see the white man and the Métis force out and kill the bison. But he was aware that the bison were disappearing and that more settlers from the east were going to inevitably settle, with or without a treaty. As long as the bison were there he knew that farming would not even be an option to his people, but he also knew that they would soon be gone. Overall, he had thought that the terms were generally favourable to his people.

However, there was conflict amongst the band chiefs–One wanted to immediately accept, many were vehemently against signing, and others were still unsure. Before making his executive decision, Crowfoot wanted to talk with Red Crow, leader of the Kainai Nation, who was not yet at the negotiations. While waiting, Crowfoot was pressured heavily from within his circle. Some were desperately in need of the items offered in the treaty and pressed for its immediate signing. Others grew restless and upset with the terms and wanted to launch an attack on the councilmen. When Red Crow finally came, he spent the night with Crowfoot who relayed the terms being offered. He left the next morning to council with the other Blood chiefs.

During his time waiting, Crowfoot counselled with an old medicine man named Pemmican. On his visit with him, he offered the following advice:

"I want to hold you back because I am at the edge of a bank. My life is at its end. I hold you back because your life henceforth will be very different from what it has been. Buffalo makes your body strong. What you will eat from this money will have your people buried all over these hills. You will be tied down, you will not wander the plains; the whites will take over your land and fill it. You won't have your own free will; the whites will lead you by a halter. That is why I say don't sign. But my life is old, so sign if you want to. Go ahead and make the treaty."

These prophetic words disturbed Crowfoot. Later that same morning, Red Crow returned with his decision on behalf of the Bloods: he would sign if Crowfoot would sign, and since he had been in negotiations longer the final decision was up to him.

That afternoon, on October 21, Crowfoot delivered this speech to his people:

"While I speak, be kind and patient. I have to speak for my people, who are numerous, and who rely upon me to follow that course which in the future will tend to their good. The plains are large and wide. We are the children of the plains, it is our home, and the buffalo has been our food always. I hope you look upon the Blackfeet, Bloods and Sarcees as your children now, and that you will be indulgent and charitable to them. They all expect me to speak now for them, and I trust the Great Spirit will put into their breasts to be a good people – into the minds of the men, women and children, and their future generations.

"The advice given me and my people has proved to be very good. If the police had not come to the country, where would we all be now? Bad men and whisky were killing us so fast that very few, indeed, of us would have been left today. The police have protected us as the feathers of the bird protect it from the frosts of winter. I wish them all good, and trust that all our hearts will increase in goodness from this time forward. I am satisfied. I will sign the treaty."

== After the treaty ==
As time went on, disputes would occur between the First Nations members and Canadian officials over the terms of the treaty. During the fall of 1881, government employees from I. G. Baker Company, who were in charge of supplying the Blackfoot with food, began reducing rations. On two occasions, they ran out of flour and beef, causing starvation. Even when supplies were adequate, they barely satisfied the people's hunger, leading to discontent and complaints. As fall began to change to winter, these feelings grew to anger and discontent. Feeling the plight of his people, Crowfoot led two delegations to the farm instructor to plead for more generous rations. Their pleas were not taken seriously, so they resorted to intimidation, threatening the government employees and firing a gun in the direction of the rations house. On another occasion in January 1882, Crowfoot intervened to defend a secondary chief named Bull Elk, who was being wrongly arrested for stealing a steer head from I.G. Baker that he had actually paid for. At this point, Crowfoot denounced the government employees for their mistreatment of the Blackfoot people. He declared that he would turn Bull Elk over when he would receive a fair trial. The I.G. Baker employees had no choice but to agree. But Bull Elk was arbitrarily arrested a second time, enraging the Blackfoot warriors. Crowfoot was also furious, and led these men to confront Superintendent Leif Newry Fitzroy Crozier, the commanding NWMP officer for this area. Crowfoot resisted his temptations to unleash his men on the outnumbered Canadians. He knew that vengeance would be only a temporary satisfaction that would soon turn to despair as the Canadians would return in greater numbers looking to spill blood, just as they done to the Métis under Louis Riel. He sent the men home, and Bull Elk was tried and found not guilty of theft.

Crowfoot's decision to refrain from battle proved to be a success, as the scare was enough to prompt Dewdney to make changes. He knew that the Blackfoot people's patience could not be tested for much longer, and if no changes were made then bloodshed was inevitable. He oversaw the resignation of Norman Macleod, the agent in charge of the tribes of Treaty 7, and replaced him with Cecil Denny, an NWMP officer stationed at Fort Walsh. Crowfoot was familiar with Denny and knew him as a good man, welcoming the news of his appointment. In February Denny met with Crowfoot and other Blackfoot chiefs to reassess what would be given to the Blackfoot people. He made certain that food supplies were adequate, prohibited the sale of animal parts and meat, and commissioned for farm tools and implements to be brought in and the ploughing of fields once spring came. This initiative by the Canadian government failed to achieve its intended results, as the government agencies responsible did not provide the native communities with the support they needed in the way of tools and supplies to properly feed themselves. The failure of this program was a disaster for the native communities of the plains as it increased their decline as a population due to famine and disease. For Crowfoot specifically, the failure of this program resulted in the deaths of most of his children.

== Legacy of Chief Crowfoot ==
Across Canada, there are museums and historical sites like Head-Smashed-In Buffalo Jump and Blackfoot Crossing Historical Park which commemorate both the Blackfoot nation and specifically Chief Crowfoot. There are also special memorials dedicated to just Crowfoot and his accomplishments. In 2014 at the Blackfoot Historical Crossing Park, a project brought back several artifacts of Chief Crowfoot's including a deerskin jacket, bow and arrow and pipe. The artifacts were in England at the Royal Albert Memorial Museum in Exeter and were brought back to Calgary to complete the Crowfoot exhibit.

In 2020, Crowfoot was one of eight finalists for the $5 polymer bills in Canada.

== The Ballad of Crowfoot ==
Crowfoot was the subject of a ten-minute 1968 National Film Board of Canada documentary The Ballad of Crowfoot, directed by Willie Dunn. The film explores the situation of aboriginal people in North America through the story of Crowfoot, featuring a montage of archival photographs, etchings, and newspaper clippings, set against a ballad by Dunn, a Mi'kmaq singer and songwriter. Produced through the Indian Film Crew program, it was the first NFB film by an Indigenous director, and received several awards including a Gold Hugo for best short film at the 1969 Chicago International Film Festival.

The Ballad of Crowfoot has sometimes been credited as the first known Canadian music video.

== Bibliography ==
- Dempsey, Hugh A. (1972). Crowfoot: Chief of the Blackfeet. Norman: University of Oklahoma Press. ISBN 0-8061-1596-3.
- Hugh A. Dempsey, ISAPO-MUXIKA in Dictionary of Canadian Biography, vol. 11, University of Toronto/Université Laval, 2003, http://www.biographi.ca/en/bio/isapo_muxika_11E.html.
- Allison Dempster, Chief Crowfoot's Regalia to Return Home to Alberta, CBCnews 2014, http://www.cbc.ca/news/canada/calgary/chief-crowfoot-s-regalia-to-return-home-to-alberta-1.2654211
- Jenish, D. (1999). Indian Fall: The Last Great Days of the Plains Cree and the Blackfoot Confederacy. Toronto: Viking. ISBN 9780670880904.
