= Alan E. Willner =

- Education: Yeshiva University (BA); Columbia University (PhD)
- Awards: Paul F. Forman Team Engineering Excellence Award (2010)
- Scientific career
- Fields: Electrical engineering
- Workplaces: University of Southern California

Alan E. Willner is a professor in the Department of Electrical Engineering at the University of Southern California. He was also president of the Optical Society in 2016.

Willner is known for his research on optical fiber communications and free-space communications. Willner's doctoral advisor was Richard M. Osgood Jr.

He is a recipient of the Paul F. Forman Engineering Excellence Award, Robert E. Hopkins Leadership Award, and several other distinctions.

== Education ==
- Ph.D. in Electrical Engineering, 1988, Columbia School of Engineering and Applied Science
- BA, Yeshiva University

== Memberships ==
In early 2016, he became a member of the National Academy of Engineering. He is also an International Fellow of the U.K. Royal Academy of Engineering, as well as a Fellow of the American Association for the Advancement of Science; IEEE; National Academy of Inventors; the Optical Society (OSA); and SPIE. He received a John Simon Guggenheim Memorial Foundation Fellowship, the IEEE Eric Sumner Award, and a Presidential Faculty Fellows Award from the White House."

Willner was President of the OSA and editor in chief of several of their publications.
