= Avraham Gover =

Israeli electrical engineer

- אברהם גובר
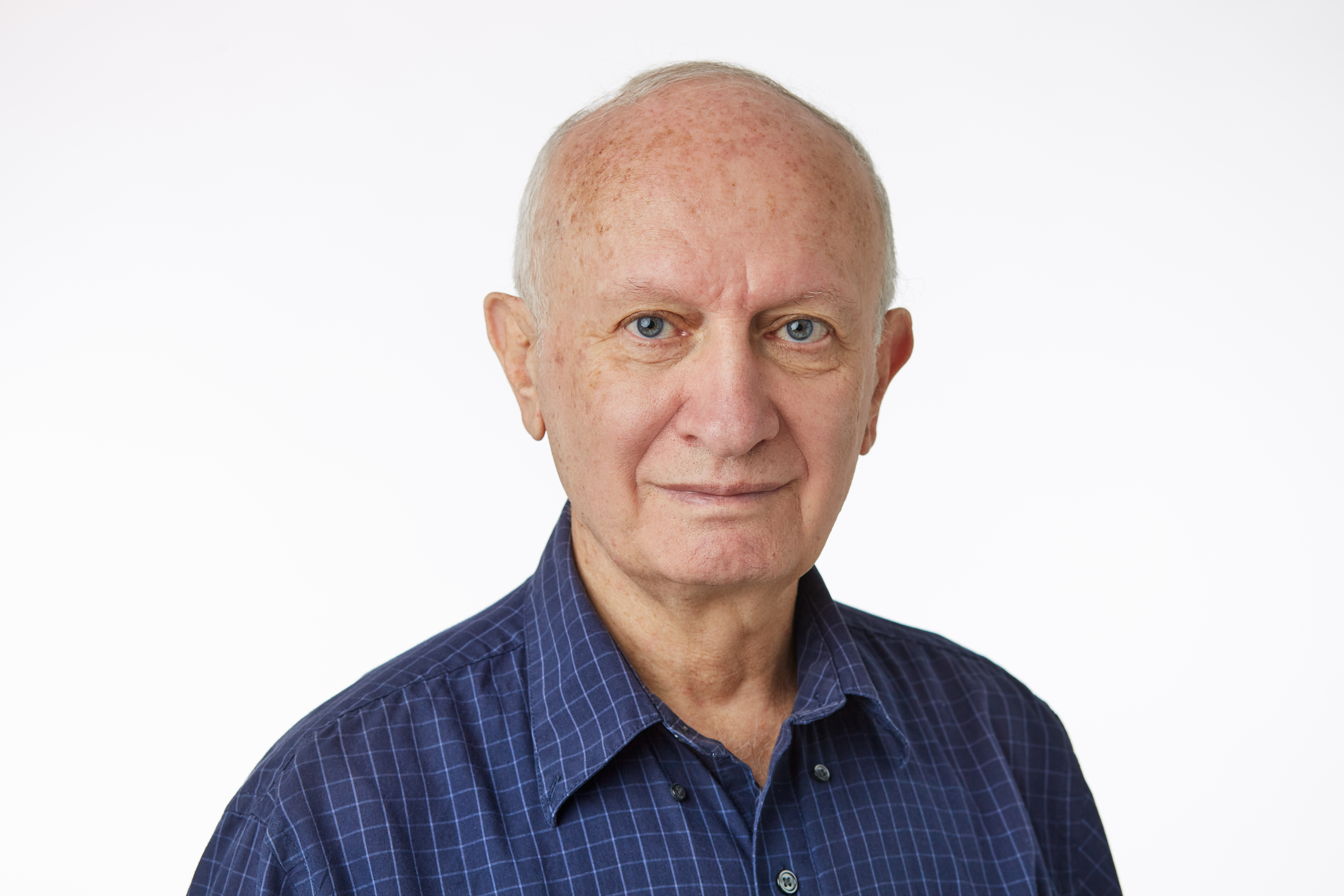
- Born: 6 July 1945 (age 81); Lviv, Soviet Union
- Education: Tel Aviv University, Caltech
- Children: 3
- Awards: International FEL prize, IEEE fellow, fellow of the American Physical Society
- Scientific career
- Fields: Quantum Electronics; Free-Electron Laser (FEL)
- Workplaces: Tel Aviv University
- Thesis: Wave Interactions in Periodic Structures and Periodic Dielectric Waveguides (1975)
- Doctoral advisor: Amnon Yariv

Avraham (Avi) Gover (Hebrew: אברהם גובר; born: 6 July 1945) is an Israeli professor of Electrical Engineering in the Physical Electronics Department of the Engineering Faculty at Tel Aviv University, specializing in Quantum Electronics and FEL (free-electron laser) Physics. Gover is also the head of the Israeli Center for Radiation Sources and Applications (FEL Knowledge Center) in Ariel. In 2005, he was awarded the international FEL prize "in recognition for his outstanding contributions to Free Electron Laser science and technology".

== Early life and education ==
Avraham Gover was born in Lviv, Soviet Union to holocaust survivor parents – Hella and Aharon Graubart, and emigrated to Israel with his family in 1949. He studied at "Kugel" high school in Holon, and served in the IDF as a communications officer. He received his B.S. in Physics with distinction in 1968, and his M.S. in Solid State Physics with special distinction (1971) from Tel Aviv University.

His Ph.D. degree was received in 1975 from California Institute of Technology (Caltech). Under the supervision of Prof. Amnon Yariv, Gover authored the thesis Wave Interactions in Periodic Structures and Periodic Dielectric Waveguides, laying foundation for the theory of electron beam radiators and Free Electron Lasers (FEL) in the high gain regime.

During his M.S. studies, Gover was a consultant at Tadiran Transistors Plant, involved in the first development of Integrated Circuits in Israel. During his Ph.D. studies, Gover was also a consultant at Meret - Electro-Optic Industry and at Heliotech, division of Spectrolab, involved in first development of Vertical Multi-Junction Solar Cells.

== Academic career ==
In 1976 Gover became a Research Fellow in Caltech, and in 1977 he joined Tel Aviv University as a Senior Lecturer in the Department of Physical Electronics of the Engineering faculty of Tel Aviv University. Gover served as the Head of the Kranzberg Institute of Electronic Devices Research, at Tel Aviv University in 1984-1985, and became a full professor in 1991.

In 1988, Gover founded and headed a consortium for the development of the first Israeli FEL facility, including Tel-Aviv University, Weizmann Institute, Rafael Advanced Defense Systems and NRC. The consortium was steered by Yuval Neeman, the Israeli Minister of Science and Technology at the time. First lasing was demonstrated on Weizmann’s Electrostatic Tandem Accelerator in 1998.

In 2003 Gover founded the FEL National Knowledge Center for Radiation Sources and Applications of the Israeli Ministry of Science – a collaboration of Tel Aviv and Ariel Universities – and he heads it since. Gover was holding the Ludwig Jokel Chair of Electronics at Tel-Aviv University during 2006-2010, and in 2011 he retired from Tel Aviv as professor emeritus. Gover has mentored over 40 Master and PhD students and postdocs in the Faculty of Engineering, Physical Electronics Department and the Physics Department at Tel Aviv University. He also co-advised 3 PhD students in UCLA Physics Department, CA, USA.

During his sabbaticals, Gover was a visiting professor at Stanford University, Brookhaven National Lab, N.Y, University of California, Santa Barbara, University of Maryland, College Park, and University of California, L.A. He was also a Cheng Tsang Man Endowed Professor at the Nanyang Technological University, Singapore.

== Research ==
Gover’s research areas include: Quantum electronics, electromagnetics, plasma physics, electro-optics, lasers, electronic devices, semiconductors and semiconductor devices. His specific research topics are:

- free-electron quantum optics.
- Interaction of quantum electron wavefunction with light and matter.
- Electron beam interaction with electromagnetic waves, free electron lasers, Cerenkov-Smith-Purcell radiation.
- Superradiance and Stimulated Superradiance of bunched electron beams and shot-noise suppression.
- Millimeter Waves and THz radiation.
- Radiative energy transmission in free space.

Gover’s main research activity concentrates presently on fundamental theoretical investigation of the quantum electron wavefunction interactions with light and matter and the transition of free electrons from quantum to classical expression (wave-particle duality). On this subject, and on subjects of laser particle accelerator, ultra-fast electron microscopy and compact free electron radiation sources from THz to X-ray, he collaborates with front-line research laboratories in the US and Germany.

In 2005 Gover was awarded the International FEL Prize “For outstanding contribution to Free Electron Laser science and technology”. In 2007 he became an IEEE fellow "For contributions to free electron lasers and superradiant bunched e-beam radiators". In 2008 he became a fellow of the American Physical Society, "For outstanding scientific achievements and leadership in international cooperation in the area of Free Electron Lasers".

== Professional Experience ==
Gover was consultant at the Naval Research Lab. Plasma Div., Washington, D.C., U.S. in 1978-1984. He was the Principal Investigator on the Strategic Defense Initiative Office (SDIO) contract on Free Electron Lasers in Science Applications International Corporation, Plasma Physics Division in 1987-1988, and the head of the Israeli FEL consortium (TAU, RAFAEL, NRC) in the years 1992-2000. During 1988-1993 Gover served the FEL community in the Executive Committee of the International FEL Conference and in its FEL prize sub-committee. In 2005 he served as a member of the "Soft X-ray Free Electron Laser Committee" of ESFRI (EU), in charge of preparing a road map of the long term scientific infrastructure development of the European Union Commission.

Gover was one of the founders of the Israeli National Inter-Senate Committee for Academic Independence, and served in it as the representative of Tel-Aviv University 2004-2013.

== Publications ==
Prof. Gover has authored over 250 scientific publications, and six patents.

=== Selected articles ===
- Gover, Avraham, and Paul Stella. "Vertical multijunction solar-cell one-dimensional analysis." IEEE Transactions on Electron Devices 21.6 (1974): 351-356.
- A. Gover, A. Yariv, "Collective and Single Electron Interactions of electron beams with Electromagnetic Waves and Free Electron Lasers” (invited) Appl. Physics 16, 121-138 (1978).
- A. Gover and P. Sprangle, “A Unified Theory of Magnetic-Bremsstrahlung, Electrostatic Bremsstrahlung, Compton-Raman Scattering and Cerenkov-Smith Purcell Free Electron Lasers”, IEEE J. of Quantum Electronics, QE-17, 1196-1215 (1981).
- A. Friedman, A. Gover, S. Ruschin, G. Kurizki, A. Yariv “Spontaneous and Stimulated Emission from Quasi-Free Electrons” Reviews of Modern Physics, 60, 471-535 (April 1988).
- Abramovich, A., M. Canter, A. Gover, J. Sokolowski, Y. M. Yakover, Y. Pinhasi, I. Schnitzer, and J. Shiloh. "High spectral coherence in long-pulse and continuous free-electron laser: Measurements and theoretical limitations." Physical review letters 82, no. 26 (1999): 5257.
- A. Gover, “Lasers: Free Electron Lasers” Encyclopedia of Modern Optics, Ed. R. D. Guenther, D. G. Steel and L. Bayvel, Elsevier, Oxford (2005);
- A. Gover, “Superradiant and stimulated superradiant emission in prebunched electron-beam radiators – part I: Formulation”, Physical Review Special Topics – Accelerators and Beams Vol. 8, issue 3 (030701) (2005).
- A. Gover, E. Dyunin, "Collective interaction control and reduction of optical frequency shot-noise in charged particle beams", Phys. Rev. Lett. 102, 154801 (2009).
- E. Hemsing, P. Musumeci, S. Reiche, R. Tikhoplav, A. Marinelli, J. B. Rosenzweig, A. Gover, "Helical Electron-Beam Microbunching by Harmonic Coupling in a Helical Undulator", Phys. Rev. Lett. 102, 174801 (2009).
- A. Nause, E. Dyunin, A. Gover, "Optical frequency Shot- Noise suppression in electron beams: 3-D analysis", J. of Applied Physics 107, 103101 (2010).
- Gover, Avraham, Ariel Nause, Egor Dyunin, and Mikhail Fedurin. "Beating the shot-noise limit." Nature Physics 8, no. 12 (2012): 877.
- N. Voloch Bloch, Y. Lereah, Y. Lilach, A. Gover, A. Arie, "Generation of electron airy beams", Nature 494, pp. 331–335 (2013).
- N. Sudar, P. Musumeci, J. Duris, I. Gadjev, M. Polyanskiy, I. Pogorelsky, M. Fedurin, C. Swinson, K. Kusche, M. Babzien, A. Gover “High efficiency energy extraction from a relativistic electron beam in a strongly tapered undulator”, Phys. Rev. Lett. 117, 174801 (2016).
- E. Curry, S. Fabbri, P. Musumeci, A. Gover, “THz-driven zero-slippage IFEL scheme for phase space manipulation”, New Journal of Physics, 18, 113045, doi:10.1088/1367-2630/18/11/113045 (2016).
- A. Gover, Y. Pan, "Dimension-Dependent Stimulated Radiative Interaction of a Single Electron Quantum Wavepacket", Phys. Lett. A 382, pp. 1550–1555 (2018).
- E. Curry, S. Fabbri, J. Maxson, P. Musumeci, A. Gover, " Meter-Scale Terahertz-Driven acceleration of a relativistic beam", Phys. Rev. Lett. 120, 094801 (2018).
- Gover A, Ianconescu R, Friedman A, Emma C, Sudar N, Musumeci P, Pellegrini C. Superradiant and stimulated-superradiant emission of bunched electron beams. Reviews of Modern Physics. 2019 Aug 19;91(3):035003.
- Pan, Yiming, Bin Zhang, and Avraham Gover. "Anomalous Photon-induced Near-field Electron Microscopy." Physical review letters 122.18 (2019): 183204.
- Pan, Yiming, and Avraham Gover. "Spontaneous and stimulated emissions of a preformed quantum free-electron wave function." Physical Review A 99.5 (2019): 052107.
- Gover, Avraham, and Amnon Yariv. "Free-Electron–Bound-Electron Resonant Interaction." Physical Review Letters 124.6 (2020): 064801.

== Personal life ==
Gover is married to Joan. They have three children.
