= Blackfoot Crossing =

Historic site in Alberta, Canada

Blackfoot Crossing, Treaty No. 7 Signing Site, Earthlodge Village
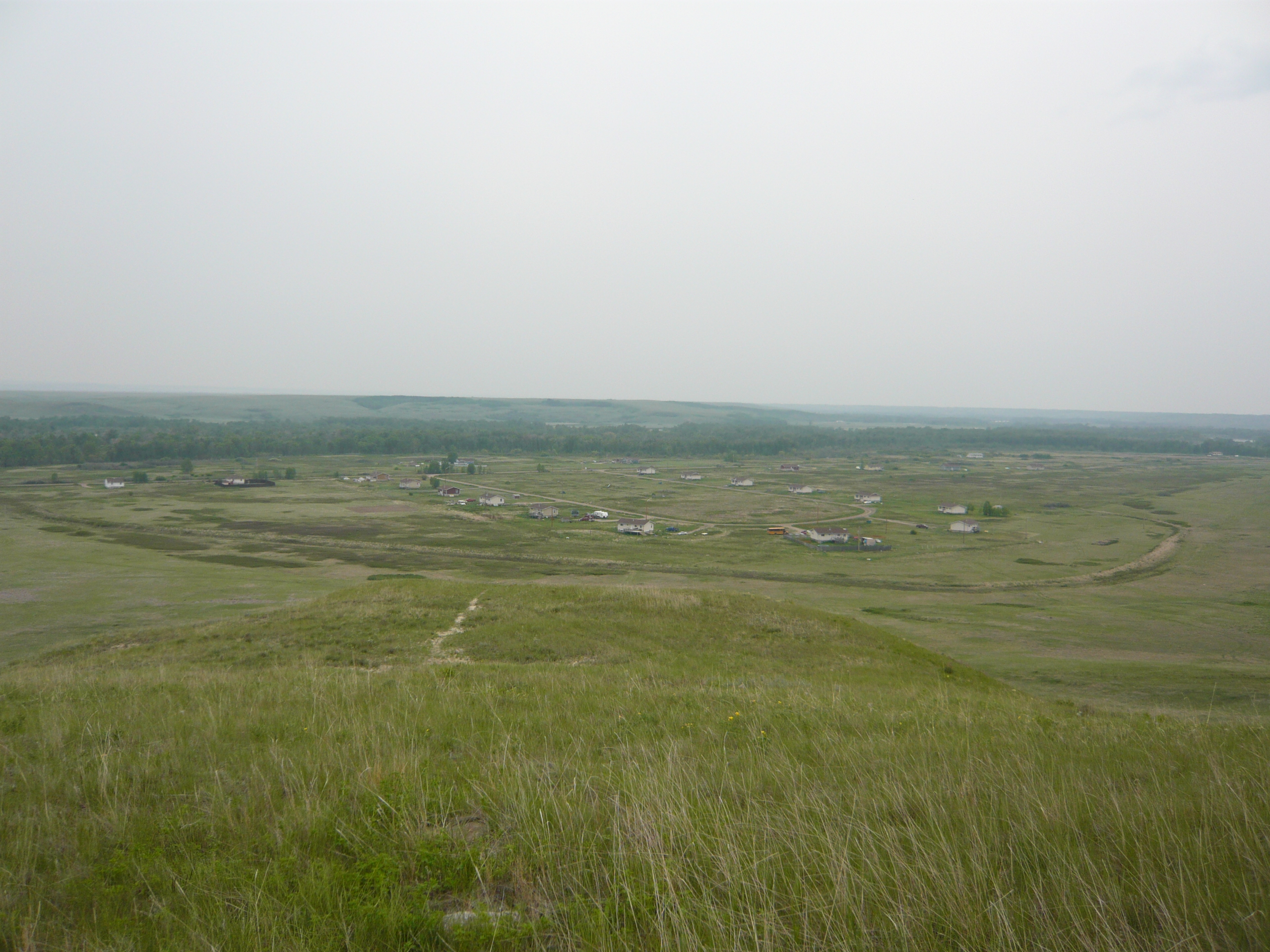
- Interactive map of Blackfoot Crossing, Treaty No. 7 Signing Site, Earthlodge Village
- Location: Alberta, Canada
- Nearest city: Siksika 146

History
- Original use: First Nations site
- Event: Signing of Treaty 7

Site notes
- Current use: Museum
- Governing body: Siksika Nation
- Website: blackfootcrossing.ca

National Historic Site of Canada
- Designated: 1925, 1925, 1972

Blackfoot Crossing Historical Park
- Established: 2007
- Location: Siksika 146, Alberta, Canada
- Coordinates: 50.8041°N 112.9064°W
- Type: Ethnographic museum
- Website: blackfootcrossing.ca

Blackfoot Crossing Historical Park is a complex of historic sites on the Siksika 146 Indian reserve in Alberta, Canada. This crossing of the Bow River was traditionally a bison-hunting and gathering place for the Siksika people and their allies in the Blackfoot Confederacy.

The nearest towns are Cluny and Gleichen, in Wheatland County.

== Treaty 7 ==
The crossing became an important place in Canadian history when Treaty 7 was signed here between the native nations of what is now southern Alberta and the Canadian government on behalf of the Crown in 1877. It was also here that Crowfoot, chief of the Siksika, is believed to have died and been buried. As well, Poundmaker, a Cree chief who had been ceremonially adopted by Crowfoot to create peace between the Blackfoot and the Cree, was also buried here until being moved in 1967. In 1925 the traditional gathering site and the treaty signing site were declared National Historic Sites of Canada by the federal government's Historic Sites and Monuments Board of Canada. In 1972, the earthlodge village was also declared a national historic site.

In 1977, Prince Charles visited the site to help commemorate the one hundredth anniversary of the treaty. After the success of this event the Siksika council wanted to build the site into a historical and tourist attraction and began fundraising and planning. In 2007 the historical park opened, which includes an interpretive centre; monuments to Poundmaker, Crowfoot, and Treaty 7; teepee remains; hiking trails; and the earthlodge village site.

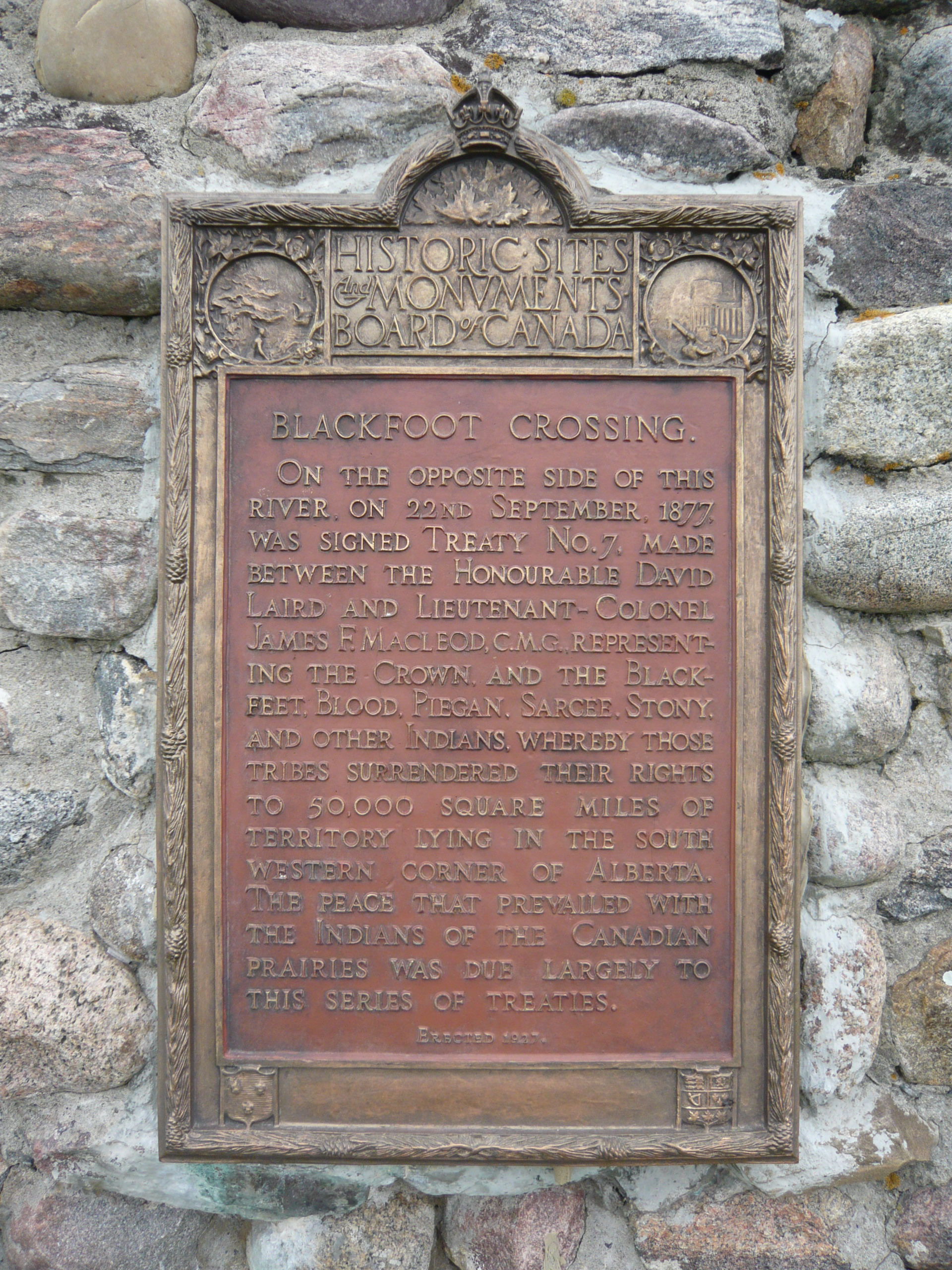
Blackfoot Crossing Historic Site Plaque

== Earthlodge village ==
Nearby are the remains of an ancient earthlodge village, believed to have been built by people from the Upper Mississippi valley in what is now the United States. It is unique in being an example of a permanent village on the plains: an area associated with nomadic hunting. The earthlodge village is the only known one of its type on the Canadian Prairies, though they are common in parts of the United States. The creators of the earthlodge village are not known with certainty, but archaeological evidence points to it being founded around 1740 CE, possibly by a band of migrating Mandan people or their allies the Hidatsa (possibly before the Hidatsa and Crow people split).
