= Siksika 146 =

Coordinates: 50°47′N 112°55′W

- Indian reserve
- Siksika Indian Reserve No. 146
- Location in Alberta
- First Nation: Siksika Nation
- Country: Canada
- Province: Alberta
- Municipal districts: Vulcan; Wheatland
- Headquarters: Gleichen

Area
  - Land: 701.96 km^{2} (271.03 sq mi)

Population (2021)
  - Total: 3,576
  - Density: 4.96/km^{2} (12.8/sq mi)
- Time zone: UTC−06:00 (Alberta Time)

Siksika 146 is a First Nations reserve of the Siksika Nation in southern Alberta, Canada. It is 87 km (54 mi) southeast of Calgary at an elevation of 857 m (2,812 ft).

== Geography ==
The locality of Siksika is on the Siksika 146 reserve. The reserve is bordered by Vulcan County, Wheatland County, and the County of Newell and is home to the Blackfoot Crossing historical park.

== Demographics ==
In the Canada 2021 Census, Siksika 146 recorded a population of 3,576. The reserve has a land area of 696.54 km^{2} (268.94 mi^{2}), making it the second-largest Indigenous reserve in Canada (after Blood 148, Alberta).
