= Joyce Poon =

Scientist and engineer

- Born: Hong Kong
- Education: University of Toronto, California Institute of Technology
- Awards: Ontario Ministry of Research and Innovation Award, IBM Faculty Award, University of Toronto Early Career Distinction Award, MIT Technology Review's Top 35 IT Innovator under 35, Milton and Francis Clauser Doctoral Prize
- Scientific career
- Fields: Photonics, Neurotechnology, Nanotechnology, Silicon photonics
- Workplaces: University of Toronto, Max Planck Institute of Microstructure Physics
- Thesis: Active and Passive Coupled-Resonator Optical Waveguides (2007)
- Doctoral advisors: Amnon Yariv
- Website: https://www.photon.utoronto.ca/

Joyce Poon is Professor of Electrical and Computer Engineering at the University of Toronto and Director of the Max Planck Institute of Microstructure Physics, where her research focuses on developing new optical devices for applications in neurotechnology. She is also an honorary professor at the Technische Universität Berlin. She is a Fellow of Optica (formerly the Optical Society), and has been serving as a Director-At-Large for the society since January 2021.

== Early life and education ==
Poon was born in Hong Kong and grew up in Toronto. She obtained a B.A.Sc. in engineering from the University of Toronto in 2002 and an M.S. in Electrical engineering from California Institute of Technology in 2007. She stayed at Caltech to carry out her PhD under the supervision of Professor Amnon Yariv. Her thesis studied ways to control slow light in optical waveguides and was awarded the Milton and Francis Clauser Doctoral Prize. During her graduate studies, she founded Caltech's Student Chapter of Optica.

== Research and career ==
In 2007, Poon moved back to the University of Toronto, where she is now Professor of Electrical and Computer Engineering. Her early research continued investigating waveguide resonators. While at Toronto, she built a research team focused on studying silicon-based integrated photonic technologies for applications in telecommunications. Her research group also focuses on neurotechnology, and investigate how integrated photonic devices can be used to develop new brain imaging techniques.

Poon became an honorary professor at the Faculty of Electrical Engineering and Computer Science at Technische Universität Berlin in 2018. She is also principal investigator at the Neurotech Alliance and the Center for Advancing Neurotechnological Innovation to Application (CRANIA) at the University of Toronto.

== Awards and honours ==
Poon was elected as a Fellow of Optica in 2018 "for outstanding contributions to the research and development of silicon-based integrated optics, including microresonators, electro-optic modulators and integrated hybrid photonics". She is a Director-At-Large at Optica.

She was awarded the University of Toronto's McCharles' Prize for Early Career Distinction in 2013, and named one of the world's Top 35 IT innovators under 35 by the MIT Technology Review in 2012. Poon is a two-time recipient of the IBM Faculty Award (2010, 2011), and also received the Ontario Ministry of Research and Innovation Award (2009) and a University Faculty Award from the Natural Sciences and Engineering Research Council (2008).
