= Siksika Nation =

First Nation in Alberta, Canada

Coordinates: 50.861°N 113.051°W

- Band No. 430
- Siksiká / ᓱᖽᐧᖿ
- People: Blackfoot
- Treaty: Treaty 7
- Headquarters: Siksika
- Province: Alberta

Land
- Other reserve: Siksika 146
- Land area: 710.875 km^{2} (274.470 sq mi)

Population (2020)
- On reserve: 4120
- On other land: 2
- Off reserve: 3412
- Total population: 7534

Government
- Chief: Samuel Crowfoot (Siipiinaomahka)

Tribal Council
- Carlon Big Snake (Amiianisstohkitopi), Owen Cranebear (Miistapainihki), Kendall Panther Bone (Kistsiponista), Candace Backfat (Aakomianista’paaki), Tracy McHugh (Ksistsikomia’ki), Ike Solway (Ikinakitawoo), Romeo Crowchief (Aisstainihki), Darrell Daniels (Mi'ksstamik), Louise Door (Ahsoapitisowa), Lenora Rabbit Carrier (Natoyiiksiskstakiaaki), Jamie Spring Chief (Miisamoh'posskina'ki), Stephen Yellow Old Woman (Ahnokiiduhpii)

Website
- siksikanation.com

The Siksika Nation (Blackfoot: Siksiká; syllabics ᓱᖽᐧᖿ, Blackfoot pronunciation: [sɪksɪˈka]) is a First Nation in southern Alberta, Canada. The name Siksiká comes from the Blackfoot words sik (black) and iká (foot), with a connector s between the two words. The plural form of Siksiká is Siksikáwa. The Siksikáwa are the northernmost of the Niitsítapi (Original People), all of whom speak dialects of Blackfoot, an Algonquian language.

When European explorers travelled west, they most likely met the Siksiká first. The four Niitsítapi nations of the Blackfoot Confederacy are the Siksiká, Káínaa (Kainai or Blood), Aapátohsipikáni (Northern Peigan), and Aamsskáápipikani (South Peigan or Montana Blackfoot). The population of the Siksika Nation is approximately 7,800 people.

== Economic and social stimulus ==
=== Siksika Resource Development Limited ===
The Siksika Nation's economic authority is the Siksika Resource Development Limited (SRDL), founded in 1997. They manage a diverse group of enterprises and properties.

SRDL applied for a licence to produce Medical Marijuana in April 2016. They anticipate generating $15M in annual revenue. The Siksika Resource Development Ltd, Siksika Herbz Ltd, and Frozen Penguin Ltd of Kelowna, BC, partnership plan to construct a 25,000 Sq ft facility on the Siksika Nation. Revenue generated will also be donated to support social services.

The Siksika Nation plans to distribute the medication both domestically and internationally. Revenue from the venture is intended to address pressing economic and social issues, including the opioid addiction epidemic and housing challenges. As of 2020, the proposal remained under review. The company, Frozen Penguin, plans to employ modern technologies and techniques, such as RotoGro, to maximize profits for the nation.

On July 16, 2022, Siksika Renewable Development Limited (SRDL) partnered with volunteers from the Calgary Tree Planting Team to plant 300 Saskatoon berry trees near the Siksika Business Plaza. This initiative aims to enhance food security and support economic growth for the Siksika Nation.

=== Siksika Family Services Corporation/Siksika Children's Services ===
The Siksika Family Services received a grant from the Provincial and Federal governments’ Rapid Housing Initiative to establish a transitional housing community consisting of 24 units. This community is intended to support Siksika Nation’s vulnerable, high-need families and youth who are undergoing cultural reunification. The new community will be named Children’s Village.

== Location ==
The Siksika Nation reserve, Siksika 146, is located approximately 95 km (59 mi) east of Calgary, and 3 km (1.9 mi) south of the Trans Canada Highway (Highway 1). Its administrative and business district is located adjacent to the community of Gleichen.

Siksika Nation is the second largest, land-based, in Canada. Siksika Nation Boundaries of Blackfoot Confederacy Traditional Territory. North-North Saskatchewan River, West – Rock Mountains, East-At the confluence of the North and South Saskatchewan Rivers, and South-Yellowstone River.

== Buffalo ==
In September 2014, the Siksika Nation became one of the original eight signatories to the Buffalo Treaty.

== Land claims ==
Two members of the Siksika Nation from southern Alberta and a local non-Aboriginal supporter in Ottawa on January 11, 2013, for the Idle No More protest movement

The Siksika Nation has had a longstanding land claim dispute with the Government of Canada over events dating back to 1910. The government sought the cession of approximately 46,621.4 hectares (115,204 acres) of land within the Siksika Indian Reserve for sale by the federal government to incoming settlers. The cession included 5,067.6 hectares (12,522 acres) of reserve lands to be transferred to the Canadian Pacific Railway for the construction of the Bassano Dam. The band members were not adequately informed about this portion and lost the use of the surface rights of the land. The Nation claims the transfer was done illegally. In 1980, the government admitted that no proof existed that Canadian Pacific had acquired the rights to the land for the dam.

The Nation entered into negotiations with the Canadian government to settle the land claim. In 1991, the Siksika Nation signed a $4.9m agreement with the government for compensation for mineral rights lost due to the construction of the dam. In 2010, the Nation finally reached an agreement with the governments of Canada and Alberta to settle the land claims. The band would receive $50 million and new water rights. The money will be put in a trust to benefit the Nation for purposes such as education and welfare.

=== 2021 Global Settlement Agreement ===
A six decade process of land claims commenced in 1960 under the leadership of Siksika Chief Clarence McHugh in 1959. McHugh stated “They told us they would give us a bag of money which would never empty, but somehow, that bag developed a great big hole.” In reference to the late Minister of the Interior, Frank Oliver who was instrumental in the disembowelment of 289,897 acres of First Nation's territorial integrity throughout his career. He advised First Nations to cede/surrender treaty territory throughout Canada in exchange for frequently reneged Federal concessions or coercion such as denial of necessities such as food. He told the Siksika: "It might be better to sell what they do not use for a big bag of money, which could give them money for ever and ever!". Chief McHugh described the surrendering as '“They cut our reserve up like a Christmas turkey and wasted our money.” A reporter described the dwellings of the Siksika as being "ramshackle, uninsulated houses without foundations, with cracks and broken windows, patched up with rags and cardboard" and Chief McHugh described the houses built after the initial sale in 1912 as "almost falling apart".

In December 2021, members of the Siksika Nation voted in a referendum to ratify the Global Settlement Agreement. Out of 3,484 eligible voters, 77% (2,682 people) supported ratification. The agreement provided a comprehensive resolution to multiple land claims and related grievances, including a one-time payment of $1.3 billion and the right to purchase 115,000 acres of land from willing sellers, land that had previously been taken from the tribe through the so-called “1910 Surrender.”

On June 2, 2022, in a ceremony at the Blackfoot Crossing Historical Park, the Canadian government and the Siksika Nation signed the "Global Settlement Agreement". The conclusion of a 60 year process of ongoing negotiations to redress the numerous land claims of previous illegal annexations and settlement of 115,000 acres (465.4 kmsq) of productive agricultural, ceremonial, and mineral reserve territory and the non-payment of mineral royalties following the "1910 Surrender".

$20,000 was given to each band member. There is funding for essential services for the community such as improving education, infrastructure, and mental health services, residential school searches, and other initiatives, including, it is hoped, setting up a permanent police force for the reservation.

== Notable people ==
- Ouray Crowfoot, Chief of the Siksika Nation (c. 2019). Signer of the '1910 Global Settlement Agreement'.
- Crowfoot, chief of the Siksika Nation (c. 1885) and a signer of Treaty 7.
- Aatsista-Mahkan (Running Rabbit), portrayed in photo by Edward S. Curtis.
- Robin Big Snake, former professional hockey player, most recently with the Muskegon Lumberjacks during the 2009-10 International Hockey League season.
- Armond Duck Chief, country singer and songwriter.
- Gerald McMaster, artist, curator, and author.
- Sinakson Trevor Solway, filmmaker
- Adrian Stimson, interdisciplinary artist, 2018 Governor's General award winner in visual and media arts.
- Maggie Black Kettle, storyteller, educator, dancer, actress, community leader
- Corey Gray, physicist and science communicator

== Government ==
=== Chief and council ===
Samuel Crowfoot, Carlon Big Snake, Owen Cranebear, Kendall Panther Bone, Candace Backfat, Tracy McHugh, Ike Solway, Romeo Crowchief, Darrell Daniels, Louise Door, Lenora Rabbit Carrier, Jamie Spring Chief, and Stephen Yellow Old Woman.

=== Chief and council staff ===
Mariah Little Chief, Sharon Brass, and Allison Duck Chief.

=== Tribal administration ===
Richard Sparvier, Van Le, Tom Many Heads, and Hossam Yaqoub.

== Gallery ==
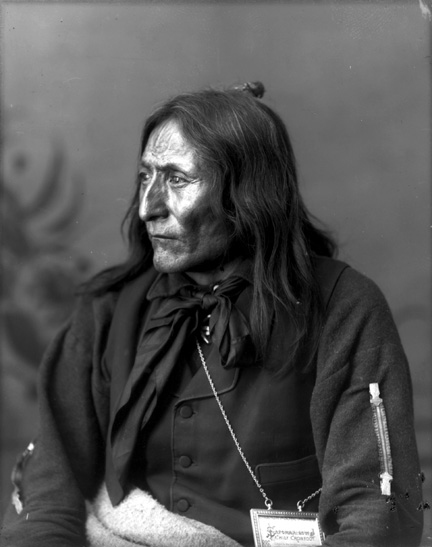
Sahpo Muxika / Issapóómahksika / ᖱᓭᑲᒉᖽᐧᖿᖷ , also known as Crowfoot, Head Chief of the Siksika, c. 1885

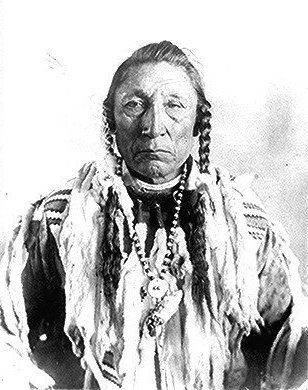
Curly Bear, a Siksika chief, 1903

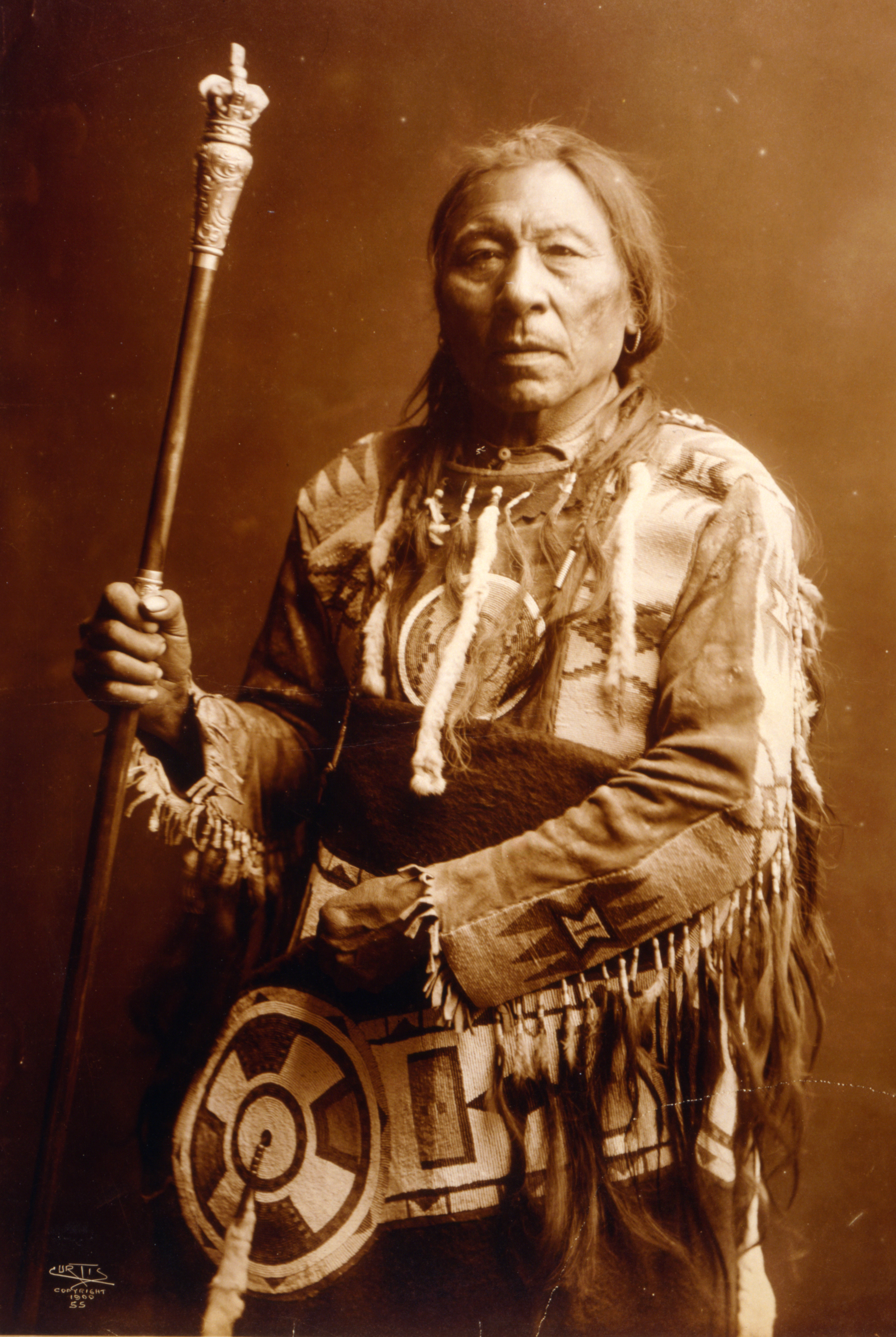
Aatsista-Mahkan, circa 1900, by Edward S. Curtis

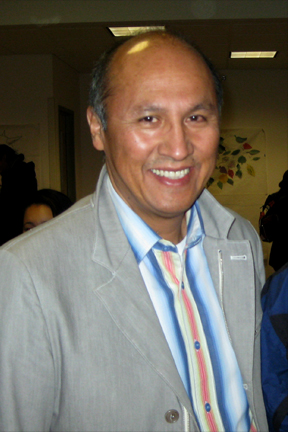
Gerald McMaster, 2009
