= Robin Big Snake =

Canadian ice hockey player

- Born: April 10, 1984 (age 42) Siksika Nation, Alberta, Canada
- Height: 6 ft 0 in (183 cm)
- Weight: 219 lb (99 kg; 15 st 9 lb)
- Position: LW
- Shot: Left
- Played for: Milwaukee Admirals; Muskegon Lumberjacks; Rio Grande Valley Killer Bees; Rockford Icehogs; Texas Brahmas
- NHL draft: Undrafted
- Playing career: 2005–2010

Robin Leslie Big Snake (born April 10, 1984) is a Siksika former professional hockey player.

== Early life ==
Big Snake's mother Lisa is Cree, and his father Carlon is Blackfoot. These tribes are mainly part of the Siksika nation that reside in Alberta.

== Career ==
Big Snake first entered the hockey world at age 16 when he played for the Airdrie Bantam AAA team in 1999–2000. He then moved up in the hockey world in 2000-2001 when he split his time between the Calgary Royals, Alberta Junior A, 20 games, and the Regina Pats, 23 game

Big Snake started his junior hockey career with the Vancouver Giants in 2001 and 2002. In his second season with the Giants he played 19 games before being traded to the Moose Jaw Warriors during the 2002–03 season. At the start of the 2003–04 season, Big Snake was traded from Moose Jaw to the Portland Winter Hawks for Portland's 10th, 11th, and 12th round choices in the 2003 WHL Bantam Draft. Big Snake skated the 2003–04 season with WHL's Portland Winter Hawks, and reported back to the Winter Hawks after a brief appearance in the training camp of the Hartford Wolfpack of the AHL. While in Hartford's training camp, Big Snake opened the eyes of fans and scouts with a fight against veteran enforcer Trevor Gillies. Upon being returned to Portland, Big Snake was released from the team after two games on October 12, 2004. Head coach Mike Williamson would not discuss why he was released, but did say that it was a matter that could not be resolved and that it involved something "that went back a while". Williamson also did say that, when focused as a member of the team, Big Snake could be an asset to any team. Several days later, Big Snake signed with the OHL's Owen Sound Attack.

Big Snake made a brief appearance in Detroit Red Wings training camp at the start of the 2005–06 season and eventually joined the Rockford Icehogs. Aside from two brief recalls to the Milwaukee Admirals, Big Snake showed his ability to score as well as fight, posting career highs in goals (27), assists (19), points (46), and penalty minutes (423). He remained with the Icehogs during the 2006-07 UHL season, putting up 42 pts in 67 games and accumulating 330 penalty minutes. Big Snake left the Icehogs as the franchise's all-time penalty minutes leader.

In 2007–08, Big Snake started the season with the Texas Brahmas of the Central Hockey League. He scored eight points in twenty-five games before being traded to the Rio Grande Valley Killer Bees for the rights to forward David Masse on January 8, 2008. At the time of the trade, Masse had been suspended by the Killer Bees. Big Snake finished the season by scoring fifteen points as a member of the Killer Bees, giving him twenty-three points in fifty games played.

Big Snake signed with the Elmira Jackals of the ECHL in August 2008 but the team did not announce the signing until January 2, 2009.

Big Snake was signed by the Muskegon Lumberjacks for the 2009-10 IHL season. He scored one goal and four points in eighteen games. During his time with the Lumberjacks, he was suspended for twelve games for leaving the penalty box to fight Fort Wayne Komets forward Brad MacMillan. MacMillan received a fifteen-game suspension, the longest in the Komets' 58-year history, and Big Snake received 12 games, also the longest in Muskegon Lumberjacks history, and an undisclosed fine. Big Snake was eligible to return from his suspension on December 3, 2009, almost a full month after he started his suspension. In "early January", Big Snake announced he was leaving the team.

Big Snake had full intentions on continuing on with his career but a fatal mistake caused his early retirement. In 2010, he was driving along highway 901, near Ranged Rd 245, hit a young woman that was walking alongside the highway. RCMP declared in November that it was in fact Robin Big Snake who had hit and killed the 24-year-old woman and was charged with impaired driving causing death. He was set to appear in court on November 25, 2010. No further information has been released on the matter.

Big Snake's career lasted 411 games; he scored 88 goals, had 110 assists, and a total of 173 fights.

Summary of career
Season	Team	Lge	GP	G	A	Pts	PIM	+/-	GP	G	A	Pts	PIM
2001-02	Vancouver Giants	WHL	66	5	11	16	225	-24	--	--	--	--	--
2002-03	Vancouver Giants	WHL	19	1	5	6	50	-4	--	--	--	--	--
2002-03	Moose Jaw Warriors	WHL	18	0	2	2	40	-5	--	--	--	--	--
2003-04	Portland Winter Hawks	WHL	54	12	12	24	230	-5	5	2	1	3	6
2004-05	Portland Winter Hawks	WHL	2	0	0	0	7	0	--	--	--	--	--
2004-05	Owen Sound Attack	OHL	48	20	15	35	160	4	5	2	0	2	11
2005-06	Rockford IceHogs	UHL	66	27	19	46	423	10	9	3	2	5	64
2005-06	Milwaukee Admirals	AHL	2	0	0	0	4	0	--	--	--	--	--
2006-07	Rockford IceHogs	UHL	67	17	25	42	330	13	--	--	--	--	--
2006-07	Milwaukee Admirals	AHL	1	0	0	0	2	0	--	--	--	--	--
2007-08	Texas Brahmas	CHL	25	1	7	8	208	-10	--	--	--	--	--
2007-08	Rio Grande Valley Killer Bees	CHL	25	4	11	15	142	-6	--	--	--	--	--
2009-10	Muskegon Lumberjacks	IHL	18	1	3	4	92	-2	--	--	--	--	--
