= Indian Association of Alberta =

The Indian Association of Alberta is a province-wide First Nations rights organization. It was founded by John Callihoo and John Laurie in 1939, after splitting off from the League of Indians in Western Canada.

== Origins and expansion ==
Before 1946, Indians in Alberta were not as united. and The 1927 Indian Act forbade aboriginals in Canada from forming political organizations as well as practicing their traditional culture and language. Still, a number of Cree and Stoney Indians from central Alberta formed the League of Indians of Alberta (LIA) in 1933. President John Callihoo helped reorganize the LIA in 1939 as the IAA. The new association was inactive through most of the war years, and it still represented mostly Indians from central Alberta. In 1943, Chris Shade and other aboriginals from southwestern Alberta formed their own group: the Blood Indian Local Association. Callihoo met with the organizers, hoping to attract the association to the IAA. The two parties found common ground on a number of issues, but the Blood tribe's bitterness toward the "Cree Association" persisted.

In subsequent years, the IAA was able to expand its reach and unite the various Indian tribes of Alberta. James Gladstone, a Cree Indian by birth, worked on behalf of his adopted Blood tribe to improve relationships between their association and the IAA. In 1946, they formed two IAA locals and sent eight delegates to the IAA convention in Hobbema. Gladstone spoke for the Blood locals, presenting eight resolutions relating to education, ranching and land ownership. He demonstrated his capability to unite the tribes at the meeting and was appointed a director of the IAA. Tribal differences reemerged in the mid-1950s, when Blackfoot Clarence McHugh and Cree Albert Lightning each served a year as president. Gladstone helped restore order to the IAA and expand further into northern Alberta as president from 1950 to 1953 and 1956 to 1957.

Through leaders Gladstone, John Laurie, Malcolm Norris and others, the IAA became much more active at lobbying provincial and federal governments and raising public support. They were at least partially responsible for legislation extending financial allowances to Indians and other social improvements. They became involved in the planning of legislation when the federal government established a special joint committee to investigate ways to revise the Indian Act in 1946.

== Protecting aboriginal and treaty rights ==
IAA delegates to the committee put forward a number of resolutions in favour of treaty rights, education and social assistance. They opposed two resolutions that government representatives and some other aboriginal groups advocated. Most Alberta Indians opposed the granting of the franchise to status Indians for fear that it would lead to the surrender of their special status and tax exemptions. They also did not want their reserve land subdivided because for decades, they had practiced ranching on common reserve property. Finally, IAA delegates could not agree on whether laws restricting Indians from drinking in Canada should be repealed.

The revised Indian Act of 1951 continued to prohibit Indians from drinking, their lands were not subdivided, and they were not given the federal vote. Furthermore, the Act no longer endorsed forced assimilation although it contained no clauses specifically protecting aboriginals' unique culture. Three quarters of the IAA's objections to the first Bill drafted from the joint committee's recommendations were remedied in the new Act. They included the granting of more powers to Indian band councils. Still, Department of Indian Affairs and Northern Development officials continued to treat each band as "their wards who were not ready for responsibility."

The new Indian Act also reduced the number of aboriginals who qualified for special status. In 1956, members of the Samson Cree band living in Hobbema in central Alberta were expelled because of this revision. A court decision overturned the ruling in 1957, but concerns over Indians' special status persisted. The IAA pressed for revisions to the Indian Act that would secure their treaty rights, and in 1959, another joint committee was established, with Gladstone as co-chair.

Prime Minister John Diefenbaker had appointed Gladstone to the Canadian Senate in 1958, a sign that his government was more willing to work on behalf of Indians' interests. Still, the 1951 Indian Act remained in place until it was revised in 1985.

The IAA again became active in federal politics when the Liberal government released its White Paper Policy in 1969. The White Paper spelled out procedures that would bring Indians into the mainstream of Canadian society. They included the transfer of responsibility over reserves to the provinces and the loss of Indians' special status. The IAA reacted vehemently against these proposals and released a counterpolicy entitled Citizens Plus in 1970. As a result of the opposition, the government finally dropped the White Paper in 1971.

For many years, the IAA and other aboriginal groups had pressed for aboriginal and treaty rights to be guaranteed in the Canadian Constitution. After Prime Minister Trudeau announced plans to patriate the constitution in 1980 and attach to it a Charter of Rights and Freedoms, aboriginal groups across Canada fought to include the rights in the Charter. The IAA organized a demonstration on the Alberta Legislature grounds of over 6000 Indians from throughout Alberta. The new Charter recognized only "existing" aboriginal and treaty rights but provided for the negotiation of these rights by means of an amending formula. Successive constitutional conferences failed to clarify these rights, including the Meech Lake Accord, signed in 1987. The IAA and other aboriginal groups, however, helped to defeat the Accord in 1990.

== Past presidents ==
- John (Johnny) Callihoo
- Clarence McHugh
- Albert Lightning
- James Gladstone (1950-1953, 1956–1957)
- Harold Cardinal
- Eugene Steinhauer
- Mel H. Buffalo
- Marilyn Buffalo (2012-?)
