= Paul F. Forman Team Engineering Excellence Award =

- Description: Award recognizing technical achievements in optical engineering and contributions to society
- Sponsored by: Zygo Corporation, Canon Inc., Optical Solutions Group at Synopsys, Cambridge Research & Instrumentation, and individual contributors
- Country: United States
- Presented by: The Optical Society

The Paul F. Forman Team Engineering Excellence Award was first introduced as the Engineering Excellence Award by the Optical Society in 1989 and was awarded individually, or shared among individuals. In 2007 it was named in honor of Paul F. Forman.

== Purpose and scope ==
This award recognizes technical achievements in optical engineering as well as contributions to society such as engineering education. The award is sponsored by Zygo Corporation, Canon Inc, Optical Solutions Group at Synopsys, Cambridge Research & Instrumentation, and several individual contributors.

== List of winners ==
Source: The Optical Society

- 2026 TOPTICLOCK Team
- 2025 The CORNERSTONE Photonics Innovation Centre Team
- 2023 Brelyon Team
- 2022 Leica Microsystems's EnFocus Intraoperative Optical Coherence Tomography Development Team
- 2021 Infinera's Optical Innovation Team
- 2020 2-Photon Optical Clock Collaboration
- 2019 Headwall Photonics, Inc., Special Projects Team
- 2018 Adaptive Optics Facility on the Very Large Telescope (VLT) at European Southern Observatory’s Paranal Observatory
- 2017 Guide Star Alliance
- 2016 Advanced LIGO Engineering Team
- 2015 Logic Analysis Tool Team (LAT Team)
- 2014 Intel® Silicon Photonics Solutions Group
- 2013 ZygoLOT Automotive Precision Optical Team
- 2012 Georgia Tech Research Institute (GTRI) Lidar Team
- 2011 Tomasz S. Tkaczyk
- 2010 Alan E. Willner
- 2009 Stephen A. Boppart
- 2008 Michael J. Bechtold
- 2007 Ming C. Wu
- 2006 Jean-Claude Diels
- 2005 René-Jean Essiambre
- 2005 Michael G. Littman
- 2004 Shun-Lien Chuang, S. Chandrasekhar
- 2003 L. Ramdas Ram-Mohan, Paul R. Dumas, Mark E. Lowry, Alan H. Gnauck
- 2002 Tim Day, Christopher R. Doerr, David W. Peckham
- 2001 Henry A. Blauvelt, Michael A. Klug, David G. Mehuys, Dale E. Morton
- 2000 J. W. Anello, Jr., A. Erstling, A. C. Tam, R. L. Hartman, L. J. P. Ketelsen, J. A. Grenko, W-T. Tzang
- 1999 Denis Barbier, Valentin Gapontsev, Igor Koltchanov, Olaf Lenzmann, Herman Reedy
- 1998 Lee R. Shiozawa, Kenneth L. Walker
- 1997 Donald M. Combs, John J. Mader, Jeffrey W. Roblee, Edward A. Yobaccio, Paul R. Yoder, Jr.
- 1996 Gary Blough, Teddi C. Laurin
- 1995 Francisco J. Duarte, John D. Gonglewski, Gary Guenther, Melvyn H. Kreitzer, Frank Luecke, David G. Voelz
- 1994 Peter P. Clark, Dale E. Crane, Jay M. Eastman, John Michael Guerra, Jon Van Tassell
- 1993 J. H. Adams, L. G. Cook, G. Duplain, Y. P. Khimich, S. V. Lubarsky, F. R. Nash, P. Parayanthal, D. A. Roberts
- 1992 Bertrand H. Johnson, Louis A. Koszi, Anthony R. Phillips, Jr.
- 1991 Leroy D. Dickson, J. Tendra S. Goela, Un-Chul Paek, Michael A. Pickering, Raymond L. Taylor
- 1990 Lawrence Lin, Eric Rawson
- 1989 Stanley W. Haskell, Robert A. Jones, David Smithgall, Gary Starkweather, Laurence S. Watkins

== See also ==
- List of engineering awards
- List of physics awards
