= Treaty 7 =

Treaty between First Nations and Canadian Crown

Treaty and Supplementary Treaty No. 7 between Her Majesty the Queen and the Blackfeet and Other Indian Tribes, at the Blackfoot Crossing of Bow River and Fort Macleod
- The Numbered Treaties
- Signed: September 22 and December 4, 1877
- Location: Blackfoot Crossing, Fort Macleod
- Parties: Canada; § List of the Treaty 7 First Nations
- Language: English

Treaty 7 is an agreement between the Crown and several, mainly Blackfoot, First Nation band governments in what is today the southern portion of Alberta. The idea of developing treaties for Blackfoot lands was brought to Blackfoot chief Crowfoot by John McDougall in 1875. Negotiations concluded on September 22, 1877, at the Blackfoot Crossing of the Bow River, at the present-day Siksika Nation reserve, approximately 75 km (47 mi) east of Calgary, although a secondary signing occurred on December 4th of that same year, to accommodate Blackfoot leaders who were not present at the primary signing. Chief Crowfoot was one of the signatories to Treaty 7.

Treaty 7 is one of eleven Numbered Treaties signed between First Nations and the Crown between 1871 and 1921. The treaty established a delimited area of land for the tribes (a reserve), promised annual payments, provisions, or both, from the Crown to the tribes and promised continued hunting and trapping rights. In exchange, the tribes agreed to share the territory.

Britain had transferred whatever jurisdiction over "Indians and lands reserved for the Indians" it may have had to the Province of Canada in the 1840s. This authority devolved to the government of Canada at Confederation in 1867 and applied to the areas of the North-Western Territory and Rupert's Land that were transferred to Canada in 1870, including the part that became Alberta in 1905. The British government, in an exchange of letters at the time of the transfer, sought assurances that Canada would provide the Crown's obligation to First Nations.

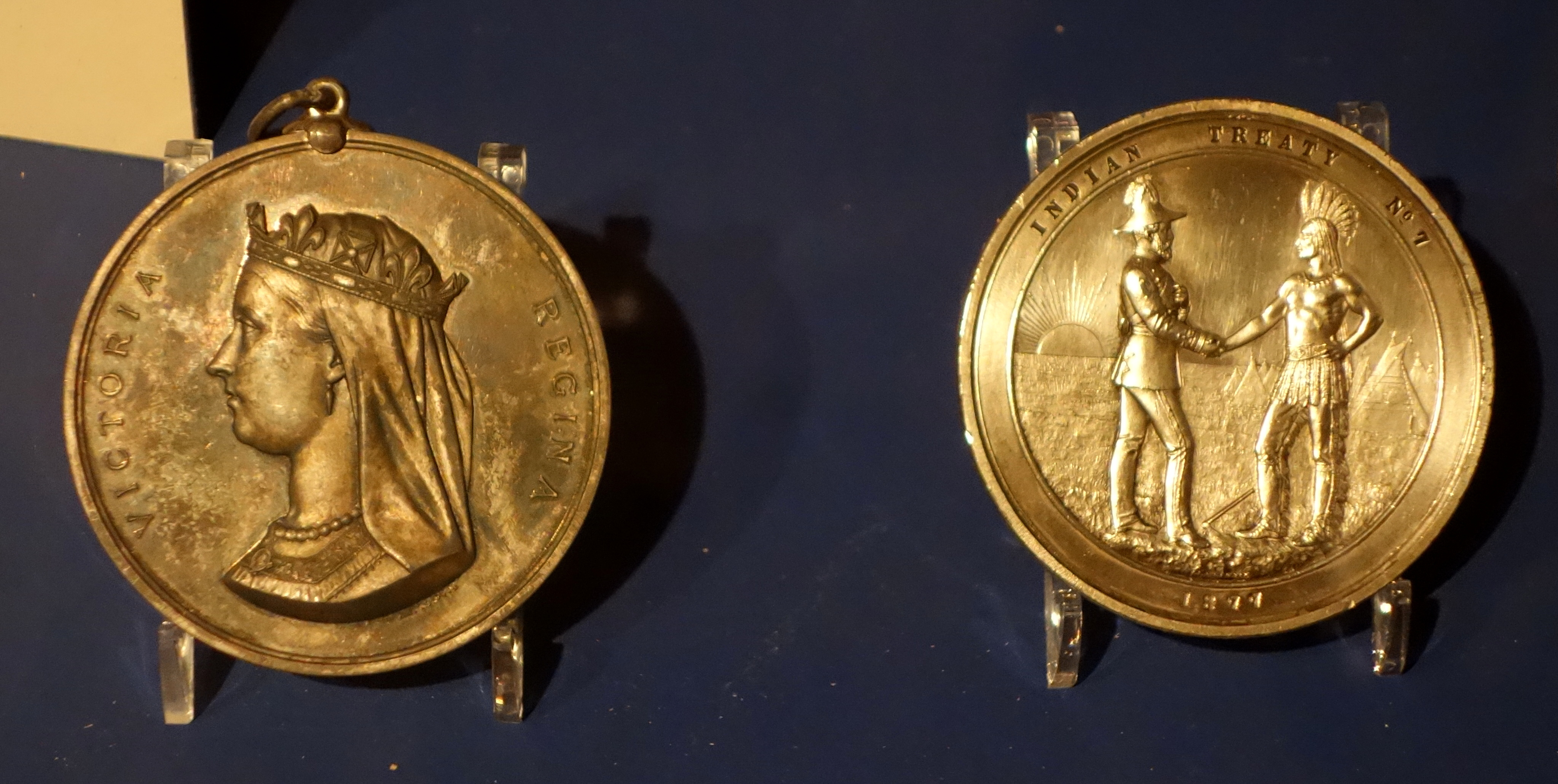
A brass medal commemorating the treaty in the Glenbow Museum, 1877.

== List of the Treaty 7 First Nations ==
- Bearspaw First Nation (Stoney First Nation / Nakoda / Îyârhe Nakoda)
- Chiniki First Nation (Stoney First Nation / Nakoda / Îyârhe Nakoda)
- Kainai Nation (Blackfoot)
- Piikani Nation (Blackfoot / Piikáni / Aapatohsipikáni / Niitsítapi)
- Siksika Nation (Blackfoot / Siksiká / Niitsítapi)
- Tsuut'ina Nation (Sarcee / Tsúūt'ínà)
- Wesley First Nation (Stoney First Nation / Nakoda / Îyârhe Nakoda)
- Goodstoney First Nation (Stoney First Nation / Nakoda)

== Context ==
In the late 1800s, five Indigenous nations were situated along the southern parts of western Canada. These were the Siksika (Blackfoot), Kainai (Blood), Piikani (Peigan), Stoney-Nakoda, and Tsuut’ina (Sarcee). These five Nations owned their lands and used them for hunting grounds, as well as for settlement areas. Their territories started as far south as southern Alberta and Saskatchewan, and northern Montana. They were nomadic populations, and freely followed the buffalo herds from which they gained many of their resources, which they used to sustain themselves. Buffalo were the foundation of not only the economy of the people of the plains but also of their culture and way of life. The buffalo provided the people of the plains with food, clothing and warmth, fuel, and sacred objects. Unfortunately, due to over-hunting in the plains, the buffalo populations would come to be greatly diminished, and by 1879, the buffalo could no longer be found in any significant numbers across the plains. This forced the people to pursue other ways of life in search of new sources of food.

Meanwhile, the Canadian government was pursuing the means to build a railway, which necessitated the acquisition of the land from the Indigenous people. The government brought forward the idea of a treaty to the Indigenous people who resided on the land that was needed for the railway, as they had done before, through the previous treaties with First Nations peoples.

The leaders of the plains were interested in the treaty, due to their concerns about the direction in which the lives of their peoples were headed. They had become aware that their resources were rapidly depleting as a result of overhunting and the commercialization of the usage of animals through the Hudson's Bay Company. To make matters worse, diseases such as smallpox were killing both the old and the young, and it was becoming increasingly difficult to control the spread of diseases to which there was no native immunity. However, they were also concerned about their future and the future of their culture, and what the influx of American settlers and traders would mean for their communities. They saw the numbered treaties as a way to associate themselves with the monarchy and gain the government's protection of their land and resources before American settlers could come to take over their territories. They trusted that the Queen and her people would do this for them, as the North-West Mounted Police had done well in keeping American traders out of the North-West Territories.

== Negotiations and treaty terms ==
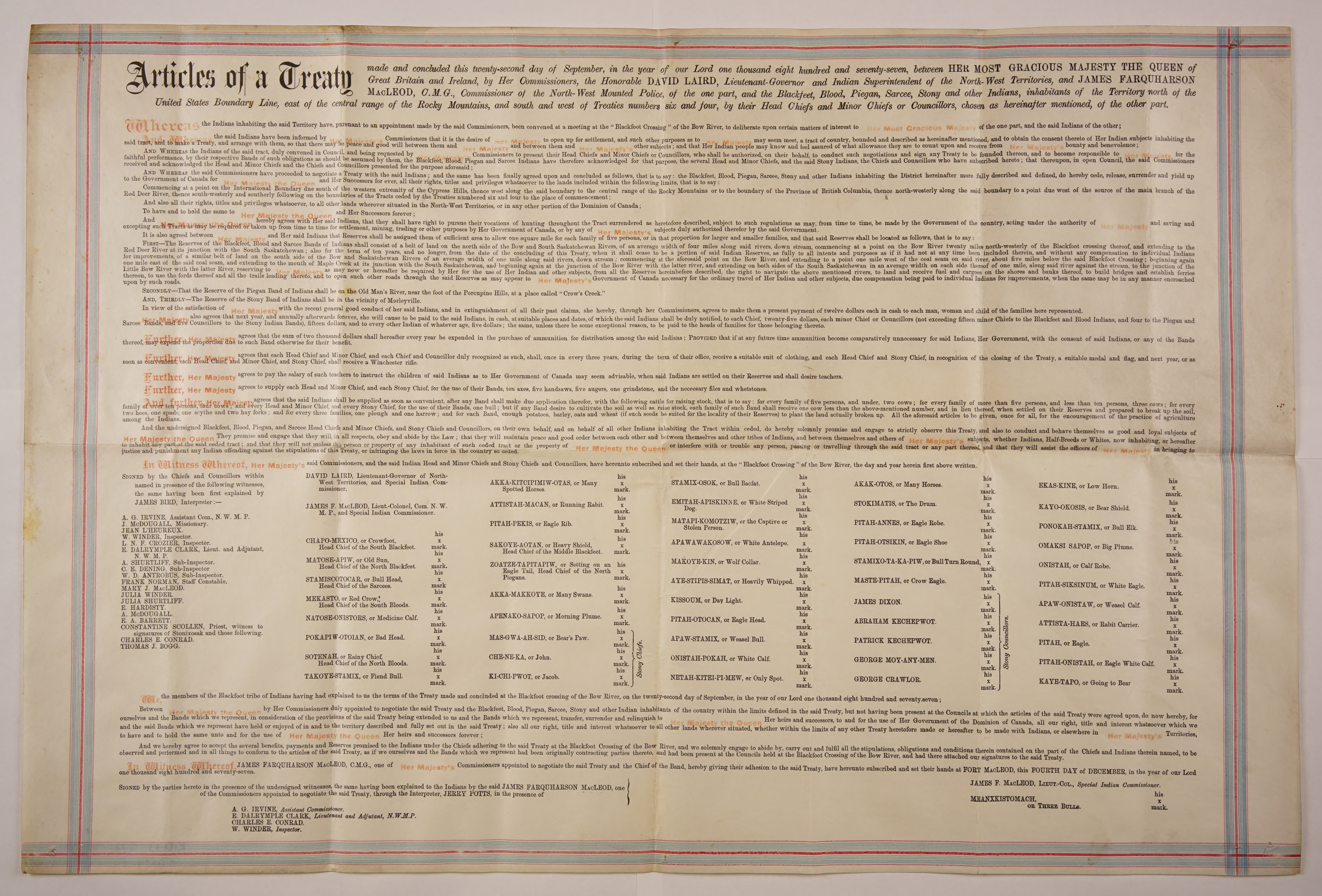
Presentation copy of the original Treaty 7. Printed on parchment. Text in black and red; blue and red border. Sourced from the Bruce Peel Special Collections at University of Alberta Library.

Treaty 7 was the last of a series of treaties that were signed during the 1870s, and would be the last treaty signed between the Crown and the First Nations for the next 20 years. The Canadian government's side of the negotiations for Treaty 7 were handled by David Laird, lieutenant governor of the North-West Territories, and James Macleod, commissioner of the North-West Mounted Police, who were together acting as the Crown's treaty commissioners. The First Nations representatives were largely from the Blackfoot confederacy, due to their inhabiting the majority of the land that the Canadian government sought after. Chief Crowfoot of the Blackfoot nation was sent to negotiate on behalf of the confederacy.

The negotiations took place at the Blackfoot crossing, within Blackfoot territory. The location was somewhat problematic for some of the involved nations, due to its distance from their hunting grounds. The treaty commissioners, Laird and Macleod, arrived on September 16, along with the Siksika, Stoney-Nakoda and Tsuut’ina. Those who arrived that day all agreed to push the meeting back by two days in order to allow the remaining nations to arrive. On September 19, the negotiations began between the commissioners and the five nations. Laird and Macleod began their side of the negotiations by stating the facts about the decline in the buffalo population. Laird in particular proposed an offer help to the Indigenous people by introducing new laws that would protect the buffalo populations, along with teaching the Indigenous people more about agriculture and ranching that would allow them a way to transition away from a dependence on the buffalo. Laird suggested that the buffalo would soon be gone, and that it was important for the Indigenous peoples to move toward agricultural and ranching lifestyles, and that the government would support them in doing this.

There was also discussion surrounding annual payments, reserve land, and education. The Indigenous leaders and their nations were greatly concerned about their ability to continue to hunt and fish across all of the land. Crowfoot waited for the arrival of Red Crow, the leader of the Kainai Nation and a trusted friend of Macleod, before making any decisions about the treaty. Once Red Crow arrived, Crowfoot explained to him, to the best of his abilities, what he believed the treaty to be about. Once Crowfoot explained to Red Crow about the treaty and its terms, the treaty was agreed upon by all the leaders and was signed on September 22, 1877. The treaty involved 130,000 km^{2} of land stretching from the Rocky Mountains to the Cypress Hills, the Red Deer River and the US border. The terms of the treaty stated that all nations still maintained the right to hunt on the land, and that, in exchange for giving up ownership of the land, each nation was to receive reserves of 1 square mile (2.6 km^{2}) per family of five, with proportional adjustments made for families of a larger or smaller number than that. Along with the exchange of land, an immediate payment was given to every man, woman, and child, along with the promise of annual payments of $25 to the nation's chief.

== Immediate aftermath ==
Due to their rapidly depleting population of buffalo, the Indigenous people were interested in learning more about agriculture and how to cultivate their own produce, to help them navigate a more sedentary life. The government brought money, cattle, and the promise of education with the intention of teaching Indigenous people the Western ways of living, so that they would be able to sustain their populations without the buffalo.

Opinions on what the treaties mean differ across groups. Government officials have been cited as saying that the treaties were contracts allowing the Canadian government to take control of Indigenous lands in return for other types of compensation. Indigenous people thought that the treaties were a way to allow for a connection to be established between the Indigenous people and the newcomers to Canada through the crown. Their interpretation of the treaties was guided by their need for support from the crown and protection to ensure the survival of their people and culture. Indigenous people did not support the viewpoint of the Canadian government as they found it to be narrow minded and restrictive when they felt as though they were looking for a broader sense of financial and general support for their people. The Indigenous people viewed the treaty as a covenant. The Canadian government viewed it as a contract. The difference between a contract and a covenant is that a covenant is conceived under a deity and therefore has a spiritual context and boundedness that includes a higher power as not only a participant but also a guarantor.

The treaty outlined specifics as to rights of Indigenous people and support and protection of the Queen. These included rights that Indigenous people could hunt and fish and had provisions on their land. Their lands would be divided into one square mile for each family of five people (this would be made smaller or larger depending on family size). The treaty outlined the rivers that each Indigenous band could use including their shipments, docking and any other uses for the rivers. $12 from the Queen was designated to each person who was part of any other of the above-mentioned tribes and other amounts of money to people of higher power such as chiefs. Each nation would receive $2000 every year for the benefit of the tribe so long as it is necessary. Every three years, the chiefs would be recognized by way of medals, flags or suits. The Queen would pay for teachers when children on reserves desired teachers and there was a means for education. The treaty dictated the number of cows per family depending on the number of persons. And finally, the Queen reserved the right to punish any Indian who violated the treaty.

== Implications at the time ==
The implications at the time of the treaty were seen in two different ways, through the government's point of view and the Indigenous people's point of view. The Canadian government wanted the treaty to take place to allow them to build the railway across Canada. It was required that the railway went through the Indigenous peoples' land. The Canadian government began the treaty talks to build the railway and for the expansion of settlement. The immediate responses after the treaty was signed from the Canadian government officials was that "since the treaty the Indians appeared more contented and friendly than ever". The government's main concern was about the Canadian Pacific Railway and that it would be built. The construction began in the 1880s and it was completed. The implications for the government of Canada have not been seen until more recent years as it has been trying to reconcile with the Indigenous people of Canada.

The implications for the Indigenous people after the signing of the treaty are seen through their suffering and hardship. The buffalo disappeared more rapidly than expected and the promised support from the Canadian government to transition into an agriculture lifestyle did not happen as quickly and as many expected. The winters following the signing of Treaty 7 were very harsh on the Indigenous people and their nomadic lifestyle. The nations were still waiting on the government to state what land they would be able to claim. They suffered through disease outbreaks and starvation. Once the nations received the land they were given, it was largely unsuitable. The reserves led to poverty, food shortages and residential schools. Missionaries arrived to provide day schools and residential schools on the reserves. Issues arose with the reserves that included the lack of space for the number of people, fears the Canadian Pacific Railway would be constructed on their new land and that the land was insufficient and unsuitable. These were the main concerns of the Treaty Seven First Nations. The Treaty Seven First Nations had been given their reserves and plenty of aid from the missionaries but the promised help from the government that was stated in the treaty would take years to fully arrive.

== Legacy ==
Overall, the treaty did not have the positive impact for Indigenous peoples that they initially believed it would. The buffalo disappeared at a rapid rate, some Nations trespassed on other Nations' land to hunt, and the number of settlers that came to the area increased, putting further strain on the available resources. As well, the support from the Canadian government to help transition to an agricultural lifestyle did not occur as promised, and the reserves that the Nations were relocated to had land that could not support the requirements of the Nations. Additionally, psychological damage from residential schools, and the attempted erasure of Indigenous cultures, have created immeasurable and unseen damage in the lives of the Indigenous population. All these implications of the treaties have contributed to the level of poverty and grievances experienced on the reserves and by Indigenous peoples today.

Special consideration must be given to the differences of cultures as pertains to negotiations. When comparing the difference in cultures during the treaty signing, it is possible the Indigenous population could have been misinformed or misguided, whether unwittingly or intentionally. The settlers at the time strongly advocated for the treaty to be a written document but the tradition of the Indigenous people was, and still is, an oral one. Due to the treaty being a written document, it is possible that other negotiations were made, which may have persuaded the Nations to sign the treaty, but were not officially reported. These conventional differences lead many to believe the Indigenous populations did not fully understanding the scope and ramifications of the treaties. It is speculated that if the Indigenous people involved had been properly informed of what was entailed in the documents, they would not have agreed to or signed these treaties.

The Canadian government has been attempting to reconcile with the Indigenous people of Canada. In the 1982 constitutional amendment, the government provided protection to the Indigenous people and the treaty rights of the Indigenous people of Canada. However, all the nations involved in the eleven treaties throughout Canada have since been in communications with the government about issues with their land surrenders, improperly performed surveys and fraudulent deals. As of 2018, the talks between the two parties were still ongoing.

== See also ==
- Making Treaty 7
- Monarchy of Canada and the Indigenous peoples of Canada
