= Tailfeathers =

Tailfeathers is a surname. Notable people with the surname include:

- Elle-Máijá Tailfeathers (born 1986), Canadian actor and filmmaker
- Esther Tailfeathers (born 1960 or 1961), Canadian physician
- Gerald Tailfeathers (1925–1975), Canadian painter

== See also ==
- Turkey Tailfeather Woman, Sioux myth
