= Marie Smallface Marule =

Canadian academic administrator, activist, and educator (1944–2014)

- Isstoikamo¹saakii
- Marule in 2011

President of Red Crow Community College
- In office January 6, 1992 – 2014
- Succeeded by: Roy Weasel Fat

Personal details
- Born: 1944 Blood Indian Reservation, Alberta, Canada
- Died: December 31, 2014 (aged 70) Lethbridge, Alberta, Canada
- Spouse: Jacob Marule
- Children: 3
- Education: BA in sociology and anthropology
- Alma mater: University of Alberta
- Occupation: Academic administrator, activist, educator
- Awards: National Aboriginal Achievement Award (1995); Queen Elizabeth II Golden Jubilee Medal (2002); Alberta Centennial Medal (2005)

Academic work
- Discipline: Native American studies
- Institutions: Nicola Valley Institute of Technology; University of Lethbridge

Marie Smallface Marule (Isstoikamo¹saakii, (Note: Isstoikamo¹saakii translates from Siksika (Blackfoot), an Algonquin language, as 'Winter Thief Woman'.) 1944 – December 31, 2014) was a Canadian academic administrator, activist, and educator. She served as executive director of the National Indian Brotherhood (NIB), chief administrator of the World Council of Indigenous Peoples (WCIP), and secretary of the Indian Association of Alberta. Marule was president of Red Crow Community College for two decades, and led the creation of several indigenous studies programs. She was previously an assistant professor of Native American studies at the University of Lethbridge.

== Early life and education ==
Marie Smallface was born in 1944 to Emil and Olive Smallface. She had numerous siblings and was raised on the Blood Indian Reservation. Her mother was a cook's helper at a hospital while her maternal aunt was a cook. She was a member of the Fish Eater clan in the Kainai Nation (a.k.a. Blood tribe) of the Blackfoot Confederacy. Her maternal grandmother, Rosie (née Smith) Davis (Blackfeet, 1873–1983), was born at Fort Benton, Montana, and migrated to Alberta in 1877. She worked for the Royal Canadian Mounted Police and the court at Fort Macleod as a translator and was a well-known quilter. Smallface and six other students attended school in Cardston at the suggestion of an Anglican Indian priest. Her older brother Allan Smallface served in the Princess Patricia's Canadian Light Infantry in Germany.

Smallface began attending the University of Alberta (U of A) in 1962. While there, she became active with several First Nations groups including the National Indian Council (a predecessor of the National Indian Brotherhood, NIB), the Canadian Indian Youth Council, the Native Friendship Centre in Edmonton and the Indian Association of Alberta. She represented Alberta in the 1964 Indian Princess pageant competition. Smallface also joined the U of A Club International, where she learned of the politics of decolonization from African graduate students. In 1966, Smallface was one of the first indigenous women to earn a BA in sociology and anthropology at U of A.

== Career ==
=== Advocacy ===
At the suggestion of the University of Alberta’s Dean of Women, Mary Saretta Sparling, Smallface became one of the first indigenous women to travel to Africa with the Canadian University Service Overseas (CUSO, now known as Cuso International), from 1966 to 1970. She started at a girls' camp in Northern Province, Zambia, near Lake Tanganyika, before relocating to Lusaka, where she helped to assess a UNESCO-sponsored literacy program. She later worked in community development. Smallface met her South African husband, Jacob Marule, while living in Zambia. He was a refugee of apartheid and an exiled member of the African National Congress and the Non-Aligned Movement prominent in Lusaka when Marule met him. Marule traveled to Tanzania and was influenced by Julius Nyerere's philosophy on African socialism, noting how he worked from communities upward in decolonization politics, respecting local cultures and ways of life. Marule later influenced George Manuel, the first president of the World Council of Indigenous Peoples (WCIP), with this concept of using indigenous philosophy to shape politics. A moped accident left her in a hospital in Lusaka for six to eight weeks. In the fall of 1970, Marule and her husband Jacob moved to Ottawa. There they hosted social and political gatherings, which included politicians as well as Manuel and diplomats from a number of African countries. Jacob Marule worked at an agricultural centre in Kentville, Nova Scotia. Subsequently, they had two daughters and a grand-niece who they raised as their own child.

After being recommended by her U of A colleague, Harold Cardinal, Marule was hired by Manuel as an executive assistant at the NIB in Ottawa. She brought an academic perception to the organization which Manuel had lacked. In March 1972, Marule attended the Native Women's Conference to discuss the Indian Act and challenged its contents on the legal status of Indian women married to non-status individuals. As a result of the act, Indian women become non-status Indians upon marrying out of their tribe. In 1972, Marule and her husband provided contacts to Marule in Stockholm, facilitating meetings with the Tanzanian ambassador to Sweden, Michael Lukumbuzya, and Chinese embassy officials. Jacob Marule and Manuel spoke with these officials about Third and Fourth World liberation and the possibility of the NIB visiting the People's Republic of China. George Manuel said later that Marule had been "the backbone of the NIB" and had shown him the commonalities between the First Nations and other aboriginal peoples and the developing world.

Marule helped to plan the first WCIP conference, held in October 1975, and used her contacts in the Third World to gain an agreement for Guyana to host a 1974 preparatory meeting in Georgetown. Attendees included representatives and delegates from Canada, the United States, Australia, New Zealand, Greenland, Colombia, and Norway. Marule served as the chief administrator of the WCIP. She was the secretary-treasurer of the NIB for several years and later as executive director with Manuel as president. Marule served as chair of the Blood Tribe Police Commission, the Blood Tribe Elections Appeal Board, and the Indian News Media, and as secretary of the Indian Association of Alberta.

=== Academia ===
Marule taught community development and literacy at Nicola Valley Institute of Technology. She joined the faculty at the University of Lethbridge (U of L) in February 1976 as an associated professional officer in the Native Students' Association. Later in 1976, she worked as an academic assistant. In 1983, Marule became an assistant professor of Native American studies in the area of politics and economic development. She left U of L in June 1989 to join Red Crow Community College (RCC). On January 6, 1992, Marule became president of RCC. At RCC, she developed curriculum focused on the needs of indigenous students. She led the creation of the Kainai Studies Program and the Niitsitapi Teacher Education program, to communicate and promote Kainai traditions and knowledge through institutions under their own leadership. Marule aimed to increase the importance of education to her local indigenous community. In other initiatives, Marule connected First Nations knowledge and culture to academic programs in nursing, agriculture, and science. In June 2006, RCC graduated jointly with the U of L its first group of First Nations teachers trained in the Blackfoot Education curriculum. Marule retired as president of RCC in 2014. She was succeeded by Roy Weasel Fat.

== Death and legacy ==
Marule died on December 31, 2014. A memorial service was held on January 10, 2015, at Senator Gladstone Hall on the Blood Tribe Reservation.

Marule is recognized for her efforts to preserve indigenous cultures and language through education, promoting higher learning locally, nationally and internationally. Marule developed inclusive curricula so that education respected cultural heritage and indigenous identity. In 2019, RCC graduated the first class of its Indigenous Bachelor of Social Work program, which was the result of a task force Marule created to assess the community's need for professionals.

== Awards and honours ==
For her advocacy work in education and the human rights of aboriginal peoples around the world, Marule received the 1995 National Aboriginal Achievement Award for education. In 2002, she was awarded the Queen Elizabeth II Golden Jubilee Medal for outstanding community and education service. Marule received the Alberta Centennial Medal in 2005 for her work in community and education development. Athabasca University presented her with a doctor of letters in 2006. She received a doctor of law from University of Calgary in June 2010. In 2014, Marule received the Esqoao Dorothy McDonald Leadership Award and the Circle of Honour from the Institute for the Advancement of Aboriginal Women.

== See also ==
- List of women presidents or chancellors of co-ed colleges and universities
