= Eugene Creighton =

Eugene Joseph Creighton
- Other names: Eugene Owns Many Horses
- Occupation: Judge of the Provincial Court of Alberta
- Known for: Aboriginal Law

The Honourable Eugene Joseph Creighton (Owns Many Horses) is a member of the Blood Tribe, or Kainaiawa, which is an integral part of the Blackfoot Confederacy.

== Early years ==
After growing up on the Blood Reserve, Eugene began working in Aboriginal justice at an early age. In 1980, he became the first Chairperson of the Blood Tribe Police Commission.

He then attended law school at the University of Alberta, and was admitted to the Law Society of Alberta in 1986. He was one of the first members of the Blood Tribe to become a lawyer. He has consistently inspired the Blood youth to carry on their education.

He is interested in Rodeo and animal husbandry.

== Aboriginal lawyer ==
Eugene practiced law as Counsel to the Blood Tribe from 1986 until 1994.

In 1994, he joined the Calgary law firm then known as Walsh Wilkins LLP located nearby in Calgary. In 1999, he joined the partnership, and in 2002 the Firm became Walsh Wilkins Creighton LLP (now Walsh LLP effective June 1, 2012). In his career at Walsh Wilkins Creighton, Eugene acted for various First Nations and First Nation organizations in negotiating claims and agreements, and provided an integral perspective for those other members of the firm also practicing in this area.

Eugene has conducted workshops and lectures on a wide variety of topics and Aboriginal issues in the community, and at the University of Lethbridge and Red Crow Community College.

In 2003, Eugene appeared before the House of Commons Standing Committee on Aboriginal Affairs together with Melanie Wells, another Blood Tribe member practicing Aboriginal Law at Walsh Wilkins Creighton LLP. There, Eugene and Melanie acted as Counsel for the Tribe and presented submissions on Aboriginal Governance.

At the time of his appointment as a Judge, Eugene was working with the Blood Tribe to develop its Tribal Justice system, with plans to establish a Provincial Court on the Blood Reserve, which would incorporate a Peace-Making model of justice.

== Judge of the Provincial Court of Alberta ==
Eugene was appointed Judge of Her Majesty's Provincial Court of Alberta on April 6, 2009. In that capacity, he will serve the Calgary Regional Criminal Division of the Provincial Court.

== Honours ==
- Eugene Creighton was named Alberta Aboriginal Role Model in 2005.
- He was appointed Queen's Counsel in 2007.
- In recognition of his leadership guidance of the Blood Tribe, Eugene was granted the name Owns Many Horses by the council of Elders of the Blood Tribe.
