= Faye HeavyShield =

Kainai sculptor and installation artist from Alberta, Canada (born 1953)

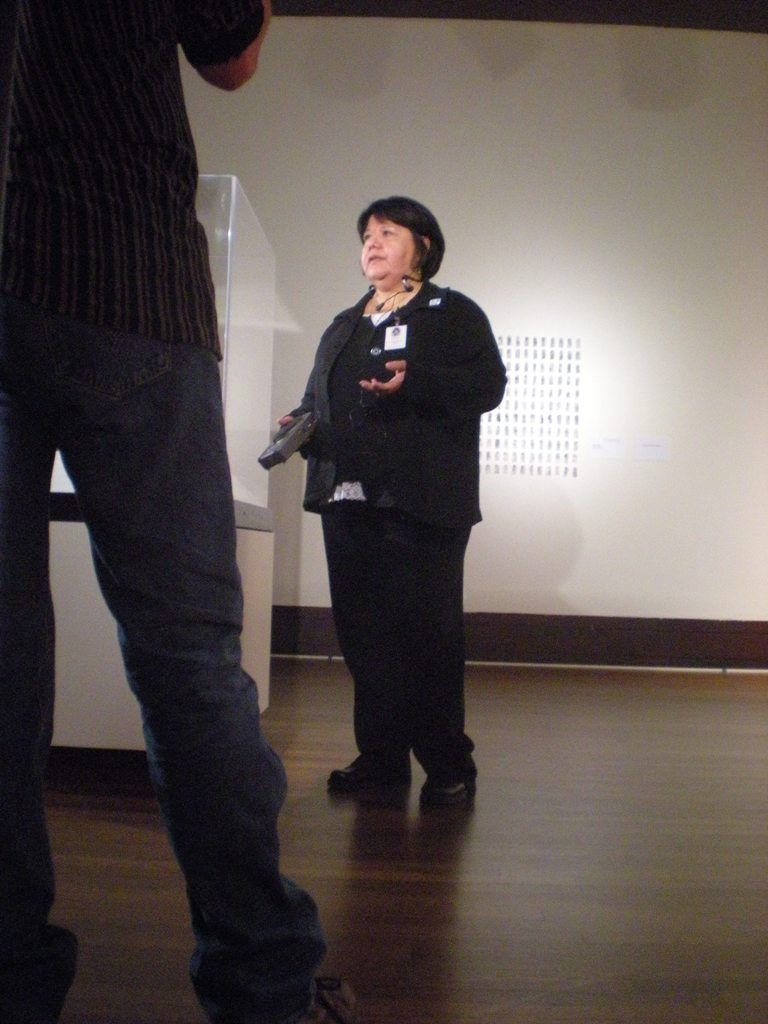
- HeavyShield giving an artist talk at the Eiteljorg Museum's 2009 Fellowship for Native American Fine Art
- Born: 1953 (age 72–73); Blood 148, Alberta, Canada
- Citizenship: Kainai Nation and Canadian
- Education: Alberta College of Art and Design, University of Calgary
- Known for: Installation, sculpture
- Movement: Canadian feminist art, contemporary Indigenous art

Faye HeavyShield (born 1953) is a Kainai First Nations sculptor and installation artist. She is known for her repetitive use of objects and writing to create large-scale, often minimal, site-specific installations.

== Background ==
HeavyShield, the third youngest out of 12 siblings, grew up on the North End of the Blood Reserve 148 in Alberta, where her father managed a ranch. As a youth she attended Catholic school at St. Mary's Residential. Growing up on the Reserve she spoke Blackfoot and English and spent quite a bit of time with her grandmother who told her oral history of the Kainai, or Blood people, who are part of the Blackfoot Confederacy.

In 1980 HeavyShield enrolled in the Alberta College of Art and Design and later obtained her Bachelor of Fine Arts at the University of Calgary in 1986.

In 2007 HeavyShield narrated and acted in "Legends of Kainai: Stories from the Blackfoot People of Southern Alberta" produced by the CBC.

== Art career ==
My art is a reflection of my environment and personal history as lived in the physical geography of southern Alberta with its prairie grass, river coulees, and wind and an upbringing in the Kainai community (with a childhood stint in the Catholic residential school system). The past, present and imagined make up the vocabulary used to realize my thoughts and ideas; responses and references to the body, land, language. – Faye HeavyShield

Upon entering the Alberta College of Art she began to explore artistic styles finding herself drawn to working with her hands through sculpture and large-scale installations. Creating these works gave her a feeling of immersion in the materials and concepts behind the pieces.

=== Sculptural installations ===
Many of HeavyShield's works are site-specific, such as body of land, first created in 2002. Hundreds of small paper conical tipi forms are placed sometimes solitary, in couples, or in groups, on a wall. The forms are in shades of red, pink, purple and brown. The colors are obtained from digital images of human skin, magnified, then printed on paper. body of land seeks to show the permanence of environments, community, language, and history.

These works often display multiples, whether the forms in body of land, boats, small squares of cloth, or other delicate and often hand-created objects. The creation of these pieces leads to repetitive tasks, such as dying clothing – this repetitive process is one that HeavySheilds finds meditative and exploratory.

=== Indigenous culture ===
Always a major source of inspiration, HeavyShield's life on the Blood reservation and Blackfoot ancestry flow constantly through her work. In 2004 she created kuto'iis ("blood"), which consists of hundreds of small knotted balls of cloth attached to a wall, painted in red ochre. Similar to body of land in its chaotic placement of the knots, each knot signifies a blood clot. The repetitive pattern and ritualized act of creating the knots have been described as a "re-collection of stories, the sounds of language and song, of home."

From 2007 to 2008 HeavyShield studied Blood beadwork in the collections of the Canadian Museum of Civilization, the Royal Ontario Museum and the Glenbow Museum. Studying the museums classification systems of these objects, she noticed they were stored in rows of drawers or on shelves and often with only small catalog tags. During this study she also thought about the people (mainly women) who created the objects, people whom she and her family are related to genetically and historically. One piece that came from this study is hours (2007); a book, with no text, consisting of twelve bound pages of woven white seed beads.

=== Christian symbolism ===
HeavyShield's Catholic education and the importance of Christianity on the Blood Reserve continues to appear in her work. Drawings and sculptures inspired by the wimples worn by the Grey Nuns appear in the mid-1990s with heart hoof horn as well as addresses of prayer in the installation piece now I lay me down, showing semi-abstract fonts placed on a wall reflecting Catholic rituals and prayers. now I lay me down was a part of her 1994 exhibit "Into the Garden of Angels" at The Power Plant in Toronto.

=== Feminism ===
In the 1990s, HeavyShield was one of the forerunners in the Canadian feminist art movement. Numerous works during the decade reflected on femininity and womanhood. In 1993 she created sisters: a circle of six pairs of high heels with the toes pointed outward. The installation, representing HeavyShield and her five sisters, symbolizes the strength of women. Utilizing shoes again in 1994's she: a room full of women she brings together twelve pairs of women's and girls' shoes spray painted matte black. This piece is the first time that HeavyShield utilized her own words (eventually bringing her poetry into future work) with framed black and white panels over each pair of shoes, representing "everywoman".

=== Landscape ===
Growing up in southern Alberta, HeavyShield lived near two rivers: the Oldman and the Belly. She used to play in the Oldman as a child with her siblings and in 2004 she began documenting the rivers with photographs, which she proceeded to create black and white photocopies of, titling it old man is a river.

Through digital images, writing and drawing, my time spent with rivers – their influence on our bodies and our histories – has been recorded and re-played. And through travels, this engagement with the idea of place and its texture has come to be site-specific.

The piece, shaped like a diamond, consists of one-half encaustic images of prairie grass and one-half a large digital print collage featuring inscriptions of her thoughts. This work was displayed in 2005 at the Alberta Biennial.

In 2004 she created camouflage, an installation and performance piece that involved HeavyShield placing stones and twigs from the Oldman River, which feature photocopied images of the river and text from the Blackfoot dictionary on them, on the shore of the St. Croix River. Releasing them to the elements, three weeks later most of the pieces had scattered or been carried away by the tide. This piece was created on the 400th anniversary of the arrival of Samuel de Champlain at the site – representing "themes of transplantation and exchange."

== Exhibitions ==
- Hearts of Our People: Native Women Artists (2019), Minneapolis Institute of Art, Minneapolis, Minnesota, United States.
- The Art of Faye Heavyshield (2022), 40-year retrospective, MacKenzie Art Gallery, Regina.
- Native Artist Collaboration: Faye HeavyShield (2023-2025), Saint Louis Art Museum, Saint Louis, Missouri.

== Notable collections ==
- Eiteljorg Museum of American Indians and Western Art
- Heard Museum
- National Gallery of Canada

== Notable awards ==
- Eiteljorg Fellowship for Native American Fine Art, 2009, Eiteljorg Museum of American Indians and Western Art
