= Gerald Tailfeathers =

Indigenous Canadian professional painter

Gerald Tailfeathers (February 14, 1925—April 3, 1975), was one of the first Indigenous Canadians to become a professional painter. His depictions of the “Blood People”, also known as the Kainai people, were brought to life through realism and choice of colours. His work has been described as “romantic, nostalgic, and traditional” due to a majority of his work being in "Studio Style"

== Early life and education ==
Gerald Tailfeathers was born in Stand Off, Alberta to Minor Chief Sakoyena Tailfeathers and Estochomachi Bamberry. He was the second child from the pair, following Allan, his older brother. He was the grandson of Tailfeathers Around His Neck, a scout for the North-West Mounted Police.

His native names translate as “Big Walking Away” (Omuka-nista-payh'pee) and “Walking on Top” (Eets-pahp-awag-uh'ka).

At the age of seven, Tailfeathers attended St. Paul’s Anglican Residential School. He was taught how to paint by his uncle, Percy Plainwoman, who painted under the name “Two Gun”. He went through extensive art and painting practice which would eventually lead to his recognition from Winold Reiss, an art school teacher, while on a trip to Glacier National Park. This recognition led to his attendance at Saint Mary’s Lake Summer Art School in Glacier National Park, Montana, with New York portrait painters Winold Reiss and Carl Linck. Unlike many of the students at St. Mary’s Art School who were from The United States, Tailfeathers was from the Blood Reserve in Southern Alberta. He was only one of three “Indian” artists at the Glacier Park Art School. He became Reiss’ most important child prodigy and soon received free instruction from the school. Reiss gave him special instruction which would later pay off as Tailfeathers impressed almost every critic from a very young age.

During his time at Saint Mary’s Lake Summer Art School, Tailfeathers roomed with a number of elders, who told him legends that had been told for generations. He was eager to listen to the legends that the elders told around the campfire which inspired him and his artwork. It was also through these stories that he learned about his own “Blood People” and their traditions.

In the summer of 1937, Clare Sheridan purchased “Big Bull” from then-12-year-old Gerald Tailfeathers, for five dollars, making it the first piece of art he ever sold. At the time, he was currently attending Saint Mary’s Lake Summer Art School in Glacier National Park. Sheridan stated that this was “the first picture he ever sold, and not likely to be his last”. She also quoted that he “was an artist, as truly as anyone can be”, and “there was no teacher who touched it [his artwork]”.

Subsequent education included his time at the Oklahoma school of Indian painting, the cowboy school of painting led by Charles Russell, and the Banff Centre School of Fine Arts under the direction of Charles Comfort, Walter Phillips and H.G. Glyde. He would also extend his knowledge in commercial design at the Provincial Institute of Art and Technology in Calgary, and cast-bronze sculpting with George Phippen, one of the earliest and most respected of the Cowboy Artists.

== Career and death ==
In a colour film by Garth Roberts, Tailfeathers opened up about his journey as a “young gifted Indian boy” who had to face discrimination from the government. In 1943, just after graduating from the Provincial Institute of Art and Technology with honour and distinction, Tailfeathers wanted a work permit so he could work in a store display department. The government tried to make him work in a warehouse until John Laurie, head of the Art Institute, got the young artist the work permit that he desired.

After learning about design trade at the Provincial Institute of Technology and Art in Calgary, Tailfeathers took his talents to the Hudson’s Bay Company where he worked as a commercial graphic artist. He specialized with charcoals, pastels, watercolors, temperas, pen and ink, as well as oils and more. His wide range of skills allowed him to execute artworks from paintings to cast sculptures.

In 1954, he designed the logo for the Indian Association of Alberta (IAA). The IAA was a political representative organization that advocated for Indigenous people and their rights in Alberta.

Most of his work was done to accurately represent the lives of the Kainai people. By 1957, Tailfeathers’ work with elders and more experienced artists led him to ensure that his artwork was historically accurate. He wanted to make sure that his depictions of the events and traditions of the Blood People of Alberta weren’t misleading or inaccurate. It was also in the 1950s and 1960s that his work started to attract attention from a greater audience as the “Cowboy and Indian” theme grew popular amongst the media, books, and movies. One of Tailfeathers’ biggest accomplishments was having his art displayed on the cover of Western Horsemen in December 1958. This was the first time a Canadian artist’s work had ever touched the cover of this magazine.

Early in his career, Tailfeathers was directed to anglicize his name, so he signed his work “Gerald T. Feathers” until 1963, when he started signing his own name again.

Tailfeathers went international as he commissioned to paint for the Canada Pavilion at Expo ‘67 in Montreal. This was the first time that the Indigenous people took control of their own representations at a major international venue. He would later find himself displaying his art all over the world including San Francisco, Charlottetown, Ann Arbor, and Calgary.

Along with a career full of drawings, paintings, watercolours, and sculptures, Tailfeathers illustrated a children’s book called “The White Calf” (by Cliff Faulknor) in 1965.

Tailfeathers was elected Councillor for the Kainai First Nation but chose to serve only one term. He made this decision because the responsibilities took away from his art production, so he opted out of the second term. However, he was selected as one of seven First Nations Canadian artists that assisted and advised the federal government with the production and marketing of Indigenous artwork and crafts and provided recommendations on art grants, programming, and services.

The University of Lethbridge awarded Tailfeathers an honorary doctorate in 1974. Later that year, he married Irene Goodstriker. They had four daughters: Shery Lynn, Pamela, Heather Ann, and Laurie Lee.

In 1959, after 18 years of travelling from city to city, Gerald moved back to the Blood Reserve and began painting with passion. Gerald Tailfeathers died unexpectedly on April 3, 1975, on the Kainai First Nation in Alberta. Following his passing, multiple posthumous exhibitions took place to commemorate him.

== Art ==
=== Art Style ===
Tailfeathers’ work had been described as traditional, Blackfoot style, and accurate. He also follows the commonly used Studio style, where the background of an artwork is faded and not apparent. His use of buffalo hide, clothing, weapons, and hunting helps him portray a traditional past. Although he has a wide arsenal of skills, most of his artwork are drawings and paintings on paper. He often depicted nineteenth-century Kainai and Plains Indians life in his paintings.

=== Artwork ===
In The Scalp, Tailfeathers drew a Native American scalping another, after an apparent battle. The victorious “Indian” is seen standing over his fallen opponent, holding a bow in his left hand, and a piece of his opponent’s scalp. This act was a tradition as it represented a war prize. Tailfeathers used darker and less vivid colors to paint the picture of a death and to weaken the mood.

Big Bull - During his time at St. Mary’s Lake Summer art School, Tailfeathers drew Big Bull with charcoal. Big Bull was the leader of Hunkpapa Lakota who led the resistance against the American government’s policies. The drawing is the side profile of Big Bull with his headdress. Long feathers emerge from the back and fur surrounds the front and sides of his headdress. Along with shading and contrast, the distinct trait of Tailfeather’s portrait was the texture brought from the coal.

In Hunting Buffalo, Tailfeathers depicts an Indigenous Canadian hunting a wild buffalo. On a horseback, the hunter is using a bow and arrow to attack multiple buffalo as another is seen in the distance. He paints in a style called "Studio Style", or "Flat Style", which is a traditional method of painting. In accordance to the style, the painting has a blank background with only the grass below showing. The painting can be referred to as nostalgic, rustic, and traditional.

== Exhibitions ==
- Ford McLeoc - Canadian Handcrafts Guild

=== Posthumous exhibitions ===
- 1992 Time for Dialogue, Calgary, Alberta
- 1983 Contemporary Indian Art at Rideau Hall, Ottawa, Ontario
- 1981 Tradition and Change in Contemporary Indian Art, Edmonton

== Collections ==
- Canadian Museum of Civilization, Hull Quebec
- Indian and Northern Affairs Canada, Ottawa, Ontario
- Galt Museum, Lethbridge, Alberta
- Glenbow Museum, Calgary, Alberta

== Honors and awards ==
The University of Lethbridge awarded Tailfeathers an honorary doctorate in 1974.

== Publications ==
Tailfeathers illustrated a children’s book called “The White Calf” (by Cliff Faulknor) in 1965. He illustrated a second book by Cliff Faulknor in 1966 called "The White Peril".

== See also ==
- Kainai Nation
- Winold Reiss industrial murals
- Glacier National Park (U.S.)
- Hudson's Bay Company
- Expo 67
- Indian Association of Alberta
