= Philip S. Deloria =

Yankton Dakota Native American lawyer and activist

Philip S. (Sam) Deloria is a member of the Standing Rock Sioux Tribe and active in Native American politics. He is of Yankton Dakota descent. The writer and activist Vine Deloria Jr. was his brother, and the historian Philip J. Deloria is his nephew.

Deloria attended Yale University as an undergraduate and for law school. For 35 years, he served as the director of the American Indian Law Center, based in Albuquerque, New Mexico. He also served as the director of the American Indian Graduate Center in Albuquerque until 2015.

In addition to his law work, Deloria was a founder and first Secretary-General of the World Council of Indigenous Peoples and was one of the founders of the Commission on State-Tribal Relations.
