= Rebel (2014 film) =

- Film poster
- Bihttoš
- Directed by: Elle-Máijá Tailfeathers
- Written by: Elle-Máijá Tailfeathers
- Produced by: Elle-Máijá Tailfeathers
- Cinematography: Oliver Millar
- Edited by: Bridget Durnford
- Music by: Chad Neufeld; Ánde Somby; Jordan Wilson
- Production company: Violator Films
- Release date: October 26, 2014 (ImagineNATIVE)
- Running time: 14 minutes
- Country: Canada
- Language: English

Bihttoš (Rebel) is a Canadian short documentary film, directed by Elle-Máijá Tailfeathers and released in 2014. Blending live action and animation, the film depicts the relationship between her Sami father, Bjarne Store-Jakobsen, and her Blackfoot mother, Esther Tailfeathers, focusing in particular on the way her father's childhood experiences in Norway's residential school system contributed to their breakup.

The film premiered at the ImagineNATIVE Film + Media Arts Festival in 2014, and was named to the Toronto International Film Festival's Canada's Top Ten. It was shortlisted for the Canadian Screen Award for Best Short Documentary at the 4th Canadian Screen Awards.
