= Elle-Máijá Tailfeathers =

Canadian filmmaker, actor, and producer (born 1986)

- Born: Elle-Máijá Apiniskim Tailfeathers; 1986 (age 39–40); Cardston, Alberta, Canada
- Education: Vancouver Film School; University of British Columbia. BA, 2011
- Occupations: Filmmaker; actor; producer
- Parents: Bjarne Store-Jakobsen (father); Esther Tailfeathers (mother)
- Awards: Skábmagovat Prize 2020; Canadian Screen Award for Best Director 2019; Rogers Best Canadian Film Award 2019
- Website: elle-maija-tailfeathers.com

Elle-Máijá Apiniskim Tailfeathers (born in 1986) is a Canadian filmmaker, actor, and producer.

She has won several accolades for her film work, including multiple Canadian Screen Awards. For co-directing The Body Remembers When the World Broke Open, she shared the Canadian Screen Award for Best Director and the Toronto Film Critics Association's Rogers Best Canadian Film Award with Kathleen Hepburn.

== Early life and education ==
Tailfeathers was born Elle-Máijá Apiniskim Tailfeathers in 1986 in Cardston, Alberta, to a Sámi father and a Kainai mother. Tailfeathers' father, Bjarne Store-Jakobsen, is a politician, Sámi rights activist and journalist, and her mother, Esther Tailfeathers, is a physician and Kainai activist.

Raised on the Blood 148 reserve, Tailfeathers studied acting at the Vancouver Film School. In 2011, Tailfeathers graduated from the University of British Columbia with a Bachelor's in First Nations studies and a minor in women and gender studies.

== Career ==
After acting for a period of time, Tailfeathers shifted her focus to filmmaking and began to work as a writer, director, and producer. Her work has garnered attention for its focus on women of colour and First Nations issues. Tailfeathers has worked in "mediums including narrative fiction, docudrama, documentary, mockumentary, and experimental film." Her film projects are often staffed primarily with Indigenous cast and production members.

One of Tailfeathers' primary focuses as a filmmaker is activism and social justice; she approaches film as "a form of nonviolent direct action against issues like violence against women and degradation of Indigenous land." Her film work and activism both focus on issues affecting Indigenous women and their communities.

=== Bloodland ===
Bloodland (2011) is an experimental short film about fracking practices in Canada and across the world. It was made public on YouTube in 2013 in solidarity with the Idle No More movement. The short film uses metaphoric imagery of a woman being held down and drilled into. This project was funded by the Kainai Nation Chief and Council through a distribution cheque, and as a result was indirectly funded by the proceeds of various gas and oil companies as well as KRI Resources. The film was well received at its premiere in Lethbridge and was the subject of a greater national debate regarding the practice of fracking in Indigenous lands.

The film was selected for the following film festivals:

- Vancouver International Film Festival 2011
- ImagineNATIVE Film and Media Arts Festival 2011
- American Indian Film Festival 2011
- L.A. Skins Festival 2011
- Tulsa International Film Festival 2011
- Yellowknife International Film Festival 2011
- Riddu Riđđu International Indigenous Peoples Festival 2011
- Vancouver Indigenous Media Arts Festival 2011
- Skábmagovat Film Festival 2012
- Vancouver Women in Film Festival 2012

=== A Red Girl's Reasoning ===
A Red Girl's Reasoning (2012) is a short film that was created in response to the growing numbers of missing and murdered Indigenous women in Canada. This film centres around a survivor of sexual assault and her quest to bring justice to the perpetrators of violence against Indigenous women. The film was the winner of the 2012 Vancouver Crazy8s Competition, where filmmakers were challenged to create a film in under eight days.

=== Rebel (Bihttoš) ===
Rebel (Bihttoš) is an experimental documentary where a young woman (played by Tailfeathers) explores her complex "relationship with her father through an examination of family photos and the family lore surrounding her parents’ courtship and marriage." Bihttoš combines "animation, re-enactments, and archival photos."

Bihttoš first screened at the imagineNATIVE Film and Media Arts Festival in 2014.

=== cəsnaʔəm, the city before the city ===
cəsnaʔəm, the city before the city (2017) is a feature film on the history of the land now known as Vancouver. Made in partnership with Musqueam First Nation, the film was part of a larger exhibition in partnership with the Museum of Anthropology at UBC, the Museum of Vancouver, and the Musqueam Cultural Centre.

=== The Body Remembers When the World Broke Open ===
Co-directed with Kathleen Hepburn, The Body Remembers When the World Broke Open centres on the interaction between Áila (Tailfeathers), a middle-class Indigenous woman, and Rosie (Violet Nelson), a more impoverished First Nations woman who is a victim of domestic abuse, after they meet in the street. The majority of the film consists of one long, unbroken shot.

The film premiered at the 2019 Berlin Film Festival in the Generation program and had its Canadian premiere at the 2019 Toronto International Film Festival. It was nominated for six Canadian Screen Awards, including Best Motion Picture, and won three. Tailfeathers shared the Canadian Screen Award for Best Director with Hepburn. The film also won the Toronto Film Critics Association's $100,000 Rogers Best Canadian Film Award.

== Awards and recognition ==
Tailfeathers received a Kodak Image Award, the mayor of Vancouver's Arts Award as an emerging filmmaker. She was included in the CBC's "Young Indigenous Leaders: 5 Under 30 To Watch in 2015."

Rebel (Bihttoš) was named one of the top ten short films at the 2014 Toronto International Film Festival. It was also awarded best documentary at the Seattle International Film Festival in 2015.

In 2017, Tailfeathers won a Canadian Screen Award for best lead actress in a dramatic program or limited series for her work in the CBC movie Unclaimed. The same year she also won an award for that performance at the Vancouver Women in Film Festival.

At the 2019 Vancouver International Film Festival, Tailfeathers and her co-director Kathleen Hepburn received the $25,000 Best BC Film Award for their film The Body Remembers When the World Broke Open. Tailfeathers also won the $17,500 BC Emerging Filmmaker Award.

In 2020, Tailfeathers was awarded the Skábmagovat Prize, a Sámi film award, for contributions she has made to Sámi culture and communities.

At the 2021 Hot Docs Canadian International Documentary Festival, she won the Emerging Canadian Filmmaker award for Kímmapiiyipitssini: The Meaning of Empathy.

At the 10th Canadian Screen Awards in 2022, she won the Canadian Screen Award for Best Actress for her performance in Night Raiders and Kímmapiiyipitssini: The Meaning of Empathy won the award for Best Feature Length Documentary.

== Activism ==
At the 29th annual Toronto Film Critics Association awards ceremony, Tailfeathers was awarded Outstanding Supporting Performance in a Canadian Film, but she was not in attendance. Her pre-taped acceptance speech had been edited at the ceremony, purportedly for length, but Tailfeathers alleged that the edit was made for political reasons, as the end of her speech contained supportive remarks about the Palestinian people.

Unable to attend the ceremony in person, Tailfeathers' video message included the statement "my heart continues to be with the people of Palestine who are experiencing th[e] ongoing genocide and thank you to anyone in this industry who's been brave enough to say anything." Tailfeathers said that she was "disgusted and ashamed" by the Toronto Film Critics Association's decision to cut that portion of her speech. In an email sent to TFCA members, Tailfeathers condemned the organization for censorship and vowed to return her award. Tailfeathers added that she was not interested in receiving an apology, writing, "I do not know how this rupture can be repaired. The moral injury I carry with me cannot be undone."

In response to her letter, Toronto Film Critics Association president Johanna Schneller said that Tailfeathers' speech had only been edited "to maintain the timing of the awards show" and not for political reasons, and that the decision was hers as president, but would nevertheless resign as the organization's president, writing, "In light of this outcome, I will be tendering my resignation."

== Personal life ==
Tailfeathers previously divided her time between Vancouver, the Blood 148 reserve in Alberta, and Sápmi territory in Norway. She lives in Winnipeg.

In 2011, she was arrested for participating in a peaceful blockade at the entrance of a drilling site in the Blood 148 reserve.

Tailfeathers is queer.

== Filmography ==
=== Acting ===
Year	Title	Role	Notes	Ref.
2008	Another Cinderella Story	Amazonian model girl		
2016	Unclaimed	Nikki Taylor		
2019	Blood Quantum	Joss		
2019	The Body Remembers When the World Broke Open	Áila	Also co-director	
2021	Night Raiders	Niska		
2022	Stellar	Woman		
2022	Three Pines	Isabelle Lacoste		
2024	Sweet Angel Baby	Toni		
2025	The Abandons	Oma Serra	Recurring role	
2026	Sterling Point	Kate	Series	

=== Filmmaking ===
Year	Title	Role	Ref.
2011	Bloodland	Writer, director, producer	
2012	A Red Girl's Reasoning	Writer, director	
2012	Colonial Gaze Sámi Artists’ Collective	Co-writer, co-director	
2013	Hurry Up, You Stupid Cripple	Producer, co-director	
2014	Rebel (Bihttoš)	Writer, director, co-producer	
2017	cəsnaʔəm, the city before the city	Director	
2019	The Body Remembers When the World Broke Open	Co-director with Kathleen Hepburn	
2021	Kímmapiiyipitssini: The Meaning of Empathy	Director	
2023	Little Bird	TV series; co-director	
