= Jacob Marule =

South African politician

Jacob Marule MPL

Member of the Limpopo Provincial Legislature
- Incumbent
- Assumed office 22 May 2019

Member of the Limpopo Executive Council for Agriculture
- In office 13 March 2012 – 19 July 2013
- Premier: Cassel Mathale
- Preceded by: Dipuo Letsatsi-Duba
- Succeeded by: Rosina Semenya

Personal details
- Citizenship: South Africa
- Party: African National Congress
- Spouse: Marie Smallface Marule (d. 2014)

Jacob Boy Otto Marule is a South African politician who has represented the African National Congress (ANC) in the Limpopo Provincial Legislature since 2019. During an earlier period of service in the provincial legislature, he was Limpopo's Member of the Executive Council (MEC) for Agriculture from March 2012 until July 2013. A former member of Umkhonto weSizwe (MK), he is active in the ANC Veterans' League.

Marule was a member of MK's Luthuli Detachment, which undertook the Wankie Campaign of 1967. While in exile with MK, he met Canadian activist Marie Smallface, whom he married; they had at least one child, a daughter named Tsuaki. Marule was at one point the Deputy Mayor of Chase, Canada.

On 13 March 2012, he was appointed to the Limpopo Executive Council by Cassel Mathale, then the Premier of Limpopo, who appointed him MEC for Agriculture. In March 2013, workers in the provincial Department of Agriculture called for his resignation in protests organised by the National Education, Health and Allied Workers' Union and the Public Service Association, which alleged that Marule interfered improperly in the department's administrative processes. Months later, in July 2013, Mathale was succeeded as Premier by Stan Mathabatha, who announced a wide-ranging cabinet reshuffle the day after he took office; Marule was one of eight MECs fired.

Marule did not stand for re-election to the provincial legislature in the 2014 general election. However, in the next general election in 2019, he was ranked 29th on the ANC's provincial party list and regained his legislative seat. He was the Provincial Chairperson of the ANC Veterans' League in Limpopo by 2017, and he remained in that office as of March 2022.
