= Red Crow Community College =

First Nation-operated community college in Alberta, Canada

- Type: Tribal College
- Established: 1986 under the direction of the Blood Tribe Education Committee.
- Academic affiliations: University of Calgary; University of Lethbridge; American Indian Higher Education Consortium; ACCC; AACTI; CBIE
- President: Roy Weasel Fat
- Location: Stand Off, Alberta, Canada; 49.4608°N 113.3026°W
- Campus: Urban/suburban Kainai Nation Blood reserve in Stand Off southern Alberta, Canada.
- Sporting affiliations: CCAA
- Website: www.redcrowcollege.com

Red Crow Community College (Blackfoot: Mí'kai'stoo, Blackfoot pronunciation: [míʔkeɪʔstoː]) is a college located on the Kainai Nation reserve in southern Alberta, Canada with a campus in Lethbridge.

== Partnerships ==
Red Crow College is a member of the First Nations Adult and Higher Education Consortium, a non-profit organization in Western Canada, which coordinates the efforts of its members to provide quality adult and higher education, controlled entirely by people of the First Nations. RCC is a Canadian member of the American Indian Higher Education Consortium (AIHEC), which is a community of tribally and federally chartered institutions working to strengthen tribal nations and make a lasting difference in the lives of American Indians and Alaska Natives. RCC was created in response to the higher education needs of American Indians. RCC generally serves geographically isolated populations that have no other means accessing education beyond the high school level.

== History ==
Red Crow Community College was founded in 1986, making it the fourth institution of higher education for First Nations peoples in Canada. It was placed under the direction of the Blood Tribe Education Committee, and started as an adult education center. The curriculum at first had two high school courses (UCEPP), one University of Lethbridge course, and a study skills component.

On 6 January 1992, Marie Smallface Marule became president of the college. She generated an expansion of the college and its offerings. In early 1995 the college became the first Tribal College in Canada. Its tribal board of governors was officially sanctioned by the Blood tribe chief and council, and they took over governance for education from the Kainaiwa Board of Education.

In 2007, Red Crow College was sponsored into the Alberta Council on Admissions and Transfer (ACAT) through partnerships with the University of Lethbridge and the University of Calgary.

Red Crow College celebrated their 25th anniversary on September 15 and 16, 2011. Honorary P.h.ds from Red Crow College include: Dr. Cynthia Chambers, Dr. Ernie Ingles, Dr. Jane O'day, Dr. Marinus Swanepoel and Dr. Vivian Ayoungman.

Red Crow Community College established the school of Kainai Studies in 2002 to integrate Niitsitapisskska’takssin, a Blackfoot knowledge paradigm, within classrooms of higher education.

The campus has been struck by two significant fires. On 1 December 2001, a fire destroyed more than half of the college library's collection, as well as tribal artwork and journals and a set of more than 2,000 Indigenous-related books. On 14 August 2015, the main building of Red Crow Community College (formerly St Mary's Residential School) was destroyed by a fire. The cause of the fire at that time was unknown, but it is suspected that it was caused by electrical issues on the 3rd floor where the fire started.

Kasian Architecture was involved in designing this project

== Curriculum ==
Red Crow Community College offers diploma and degree programs in partnership with the universities of Calgary and Lethbridge. It also provides adult upgrading, continuing, and community education. Red Crow Community College has recently added the Kainai Studies department, which had a unique curriculum based in the Blackfoot/Kainai/Blood worldview. This recent addition to Red Crow Community College addresses the need to educate Kainai members and others about the lifeways and philosophy of the Niitsitapi (the Blackfoot-language autonym, their name for themselves, meaning "real" or "natural" people).

Red Crow Community College offers the Aboriginal Practical Nurse Diploma Program in partnership with Bow Valley College.

Red Crow Community College offers a master's degree in social work in partnership with the University of Calgary commencing in the summer of 2007 with 15 registrants.

Red Crow Community College offers a master's degree in education, in partnership with the University of Lethbridge. Sinte Gleska University has partnered with Red Crow Community College and Old Sun Community College, both in Alberta, Canada, enabling them to offer a master's degree in education, with an emphasis in early childhood special education.
