= Beverly Hungry Wolf =

Canadian writer

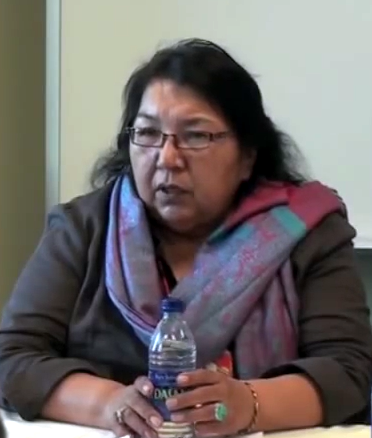
Beverley Hungry Wolf at the University of Calgary in 2009

Beverly Hungry Wolf (Sikski-Aki, or Black-faced Woman; born 1950) is a Canadian writer and a member of the Blackfoot Confederacy.

== Life ==
She was born Beverly Little Bear in 1950 near Cardston, Alberta, on Blood Indian Reserve No. 148, and studied at a Catholic residential school on the reserve. The school discouraged interest in her tribe's traditions, but, as an adult, she started investigating and recording them after she married a German man, Adolph Gutöhrlein. Gutöhrlein was fascinated with First Nations' culture, having immersed himself in it and adopting the surname Hungry Wolf.

Along with her husband, Hungry Wolf has published a number of books about her personal and her people's experiences. She interviewed her female relatives and tribal elders, collecting information about gender roles, domestic arts, child rearing, myths and legends, which she published in Ways of my Grandmothers (1980). Her interview subjects included her grandmother, Anada-Aki, her aunt, Mary One Spot, and tribal elder, Paula Weasel Head.

She and her husband live in British Columbia and have five children.

== Works ==
=== The Ways of My Grandmothers ===
The Ways of my Grandmothers (1980) follows the story of Blackfoot women during the old way of life in Alberta, Canada. The novel incorporates tribal history, legends, and myths passed down through generations of women. Hungry Wolf incorporates her personal stories while portraying the livelihood of Blackfoot women in the past and modern times through storytelling and rare photographs.

=== Daughters of the Buffalo Women ===
Daughters of the Buffalo Women: Maintaining the Tribal Faith (1996) is a collection stories told by Hungry Wolf's mother as well as other Blackfoot elders from the time of Buffalo hunting. The novel takes place in Montana and Canada during the early 1900s.

=== Other works ===
Beverly Hungry Wolf has co-authored three non-fiction books with her husband, Adolph Gutöhrlein: Blackfoot Craftworker's Book (1983), Shadows of the Buffalo: A family Odyssey Among the Indians (1983), and Children of the Sun: Stories By and About Indian Kids (1987).
