= Bjarne Store-Jakobsen =

Norwegian politician (born 1944)

Member of the Sámi Parliament of Norway for the Gaska Romsa (Midt-Troms) constituency
- In office 2005–2009 Serving with Lene Hansen, Randi A. Skum

Personal details
- Born: 12 January 1944 (age 82) Karlebotn, Norway
- Party: Labour Party (Ap, before 2015); Sámi People's Party (SfP, after 2015)
- Spouse: Esther Tailfeathers (divorced)
- Relations: Elle-Máijá Tailfeathers (daughter)
- Occupation: Journalist, politician

Bjarne Store-Jakobsen (born 12 January 1944) is a Norwegian politician, activist, and journalist. In 2005, he was elected to the Sámi Parliament of Norway as a member of the Labour Party. He was selected by the Sámi parliament to serve as a representative for the Sami People of Norway at the Working Group on Indigenous Peoples at the Barents Euro-Arctic Council, where he would serve as leader. He served as an advisor for the President of the Sámi Parliament Egil Olli until his dismissal in 2011. He would later leave the Labour Party and serve as the leader of the Sámi People's Party.

Prior to his time in politics, Store-Jakobsen served as a spokesperson and unofficial leader for the Sami people protesting against the development of the Alta Hydroelectric Power Station during the Alta controversy. Store-Jakobsen worked in the film and television industry as a journalist for 15 years, working for Nordlys, Sámi Áigi, and Sveriges Television. His life is depicted in the 2014 film Bihttoš, directed by his daughter, Elle-Máijá Tailfeathers.

== Early life and career ==
Store-Jakobsen was born on 12 January 1944 in the village of Karlebotn and was raised in the village of Vesterelv (Nesseby Municipality in Finnmark county), Norway. He met his former wife, Esther Tailfeathers, at the 1981 World Council of Indigenous Peoples General Assembly in Canberra, Australia.

During the late 1970s and early 1980s, amid the Alta controversy, Store-Jakobsen served in a leadership position for the ČSV Sámi rights movement. He was considered the "brains behind" the movement, for Sami activists challenging the development of a hydroelectric plant, the Alta Hydroelectric Power Station, by the Norwegian government on the Altaelva. He served as the spokesman for the Sami who were undergoing a hunger strike at the Storting to oppose the development, citing the dam's subsequent threat to flood the Sámi community of Masi, Norway, and as an assertion of self-determination on their pastoral lands. Store-Jakobsen opposed the development, since individuals in the reindeer husbandry sector were opposed to the development, and his belief in the importance of protecting the nature in the area. As an activist, he was referred as the nickname "Bihttoš Bierna" (Rebel Bjarne). Amid the confrontation, Store-Jakobsen stated that he was allegedly contacted by several European terrorist organizations, whose assistance he turned down. During the confrontation, Store-Jakobsen insisted that the protests be exclusively peaceful, refusing a proposal to sink the Janina, a ship used to house police officers, citing that the action would be a violent escalation.

A trained journalist, Store-Jakobsen worked in the film and television production industries for 15 years, working as a journalist and editor. Prior to January 1978, Store-Jakobsen worked for Nordlys as a correspondent for Alta, quitting over management of the Sami editorial line. In the 1980s, Store-Jakobsen worked for the newspaper Sámi Áigi in Karasjok, as its editor. In 2003, he was working as the head of the Sami editorial department for Sveriges Television in Kiruna. As of 2007, Store-Jakobsen was a member of the Sami Film Association.

== Political career ==
From 2005 to 2009, Store-Jakobsen was elected to the Sámi Parliament of Norway in the 2005 Norwegian Sámi parliamentary election, representing the Midt-Troms constituency as a member of the Labour Party (Ap). During his time in the Sami parliament, he served as a member for the business and culture committee.

In 2008, Store-Jakobsen was appointed by the Sámi Parliament of Norway as the representative of the Sami people of Norway at the Working Group of Indigenous Peoples in the Barents Euro-Arctic Council (BEAC). He was appointed for a second time in 2010, continuing to represent the Sami people of Norway. During his time in the BEAC, he served as head of the Working Group of Indigenous Peoples. As part of BEAC, Store-Jakobsen led the "Vyngy syo" (Voice of the Tundra) project, aimed at organizing Nenets language broadcasting in the Nenets Autonomous Okrug. In his capacity as leader for the working group, he was critical of Russian government programs targeting Indigenous people's relationship with alcohol and the failure to provide alternative employment for communities. He called for the Norwegian Ministry of Foreign Affairs to provide financial support and prevent the bankruptcy of Kola Sámi Radio. The position oversaw the attempted implementation of the reindeer husbandry industry within the Sami of the Kola Peninsula with the project "Obsjina Kildin".

In June 2011, Store-Jakobsen was removed from his post of advisor to the President of the Sámi Parliament of Norway. Incumbent President Egil Olli cited the need for renewal in the post, stating that the then 67-year-old man was too old for the position, while Store-Jakobsen cited internal power struggles as the reason for his ouster. Amid the confrontation, Olli revealed that Store-Jakobsen discussed with him his intent to undermine fellow Ap politician and vice president Marianne Balto. Store-Jakobsen replied that he had expressed his hesitancy at Balto's suitability as president and his intent to work for other candidates vying for the position. He was replaced by Johan Vasara.

On 22 March 2015, He was chosen as the Sámi People's Party's (SfP) mayoral candidate for Unjárga Municipality (Nesseby). During his run, he called for increased transparency for the mayor's office, as well as improving infrastructure for the growing fishing industry in the municipality. He was subsequently elected to the municipal council, as one of three SfP representatives. Store-Jakobsen placed fourth overall for personal votes, with 57 votes cast. On 5 December 2015, Store-Jakobsen was elected leader of the SfP. He ran for the party in the 2021 Norwegian Sámi parliamentary election for the SfP as the first ranked candidate for the Eastern (Østre) constituency.

== Views ==
Store-Jakobsen views the relationship between the Sami and the Norwegian people as one of "colonization", which Jonathan Crossen compared to the treatment of Indigenous Canadians by the Canadian government. Store-Jakobsen supports the establishment of a truth and reconciliation commission for the whole of Sápmi with regards to Sami children forced to attend schools that were distant from their communities. He is critical of the Sámi Parliament of Norway's effectiveness, expressing his dissatisfaction with its weakness and lack of sway within society. Store-Jakobsen described the Finnmark Estate as a quasi-solution to the ongoing issues and did not work for Sami rights. During the discussions on the 2-2-2 governance system of the Hålogalandsallmenningen, he opposed it on the grounds that it would weaken the position of the Southern Sami. He believed that the Norwegian government and the Sámi parliament should work harder to rectify racist perceptions through ensuring correct information is presented in primary school. He advocated for the implementation dual naming or monolingual Sami language names for Nesseby locales. He expressed opposition to the Ap-led municipal council's removal of Sami language names on road signs.

As leader of the SfP, Store-Jakobsen was critical of Sami Parliamentary President Aili Keskitalo's decision to form a coalition with the Centre Party, citing the NSR's stance on forming coalitions with solely Sámi political parties, criticizing Keskitalo's reluctance to work with his party. Keskitalo cited the SfP's demands as being difficult to meet as reason for her reluctance to form a coalition with the party. During his run for Nesseby mayor Store-Jakobsen expressed willingness to accept refugees on humanitarian grounds. He was critical of Nesseby mayor Knut Store's decision to reject the acceptance of asylum seekers to the municipality, labelling his rejection in accordance with the policies of the Progress Party. He was critical of the Sami Parliament under the Olli administration agreeing on compromise measures with the Norwegian government's with regards to the stifling of the Sea Sami's fishing rights.

Store-Jakobsen advocated for the release of Leonard Peltier during the Barack Obama administration. He visited Peltier, and called on previous Sami parliament presidents Egil Olli and Vibeke Larsen in calling for his release.

== Personal life ==
Store-Jakobsen currently lives in Unjárga Municipality (Nesseby) in Finnmark county. As of 2021, he worked as a freelancer.

Store-Jakobsen is the father of Norwegian-Canadian filmmaker Elle-Máijá Tailfeathers. His relationship with his former wife Esther Tailfeathers and his daughter are the subject of her 2014 film Bihttoš (Rebel). The film details the couple's "mythical love story" from their meeting at the 1981 World Council of Indigenous Peoples assembly in Australia to their eventual divorce. It deals with his struggles with depression, his suicide attempt, and the consequences for their family, as well as his reconnection with his daughter and sharing with her his experiences in the Sámi boarding school system.
