= World Council of Indigenous Peoples =

International organization, 1974–1996

- Formation: 1974
- Founder: George Manuel
- Dissolved: 1996
- Purpose: having concepts of aboriginal rights accepted on a worldwide scale
- Headquarters: Canada

The World Council of Indigenous Peoples (WCIP) was a formal international body dedicated to having concepts of aboriginal rights accepted on a worldwide scale. The WCIP had observer status in the United Nations, a secretariat based in Canada and represented over 60,000,000 Indigenous peoples worldwide.

The council dealt with the economic, cultural, political, and social rights of indigenous peoples, along with the retention of their land and natural resources. Before dissolving in 1996 the WCIP was a powerful force for indigenous peoples, giving its members a concrete experience in international politics.

== Indigenous Rights ==
The WCIP was built upon the shared history of Indigenous peoples around the world. The WCIP believes that indigenous peoples have experienced a shared history of intimidation, threat, deprivation, injustice, discrimination and genocide, and have felt themselves threatened by extinction. They seek rights to self-determination and self-government, as the WCIP believes that colonialism has rendered them vulnerable to domination and control by more powerful nations and peoples.

The WCIP was the first global effort established by indigenous peoples to preserve and protect the group integrity of aboriginal and indigenous peoples worldwide. They regard the "preservation and protection of Indigenous interests essential to the preservation of world peace and world development."

== Formation ==
George Manuel, President of the National Indian Brotherhood and member of the Shuswap Tribe of British Columbia, had travelled with Jean Chrétien to New Zealand. Upon his return, Manuel said:

"I hope that the common history and shared values that we discovered in each other are only the seeds from which some kind of lasting framework can grow for a common alliance of Native Peoples."

In 1972 Manuel, along with the General Assembly of the National Indian Brotherhood (NIB) endorsed the idea of an international conference of indigenous peoples. It also authorized the NIB to apply for Non-Governmental Organization (NGO) status at the UN.

The first preparatory meeting for the world conference was held from April 8 - 11th in Guyana 1974. It included representatives from Australia, Canada, Colombia, Greenland, Guyana, New Zealand, Norway and the United States.

They developed a social and political definition of "indigenous people" which stated:

"The term indigenous people refers to people living in countries which have a population composed of differing ethnic or racial groups who are descendants of the earliest populations living in the area and who do not as a group control the national government of the countries within which they live."

In May 1974 the NIB was granted NGO status by the Economic and Social Council of the UN, based on the fact that there was not yet another international organization of indigenous peoples in existence. The NIB was thus supposed to transfer its NGO status to an international organization should one form.

== The Conference ==
The final international conference was held in Port Alberni, British Columbia, from October 27 - 31st, 1975. It was hosted by the Sheshaht Band of the Nuu-chah-nulth people on reserve land. Representatives were present from the following countries: Argentina, Australia, Bolivia, Canada, Colombia, Ecuador, Finland, Greenland, Guatemala, Mexico, New Zealand, Nicaragua, Norway, Panama, Paraguay, Peru, Sweden, the United States and Venezuela. There were 260 participants, 135 observers, 25 members of the press and 54 staff members present. Each country wore its traditional garb and showed cultural pride through song, dance and ceremony.

The delegates were scheduled to attend 5 workshops, each pertaining to important indigenous issues:

1. representation at the United Nations
2. the Charter of the World Council of Indigenous Peoples
3. social, economic and political justice
4. retention of cultural identity
5. retention of land and natural resources.

The final days of the Conference elected George Manuel as chairman, Sam Deloria of the US as secretary general, and also elected a board of representatives. Finally, the conference resolved to prepare a study of the problems of discrimination against Indigenous peoples, and decided that the WCIP would take over the NGO status of the NIB.

== Support ==
Financial support for the WCIP came from Canada, Guyana, Norway and Denmark. Funds also came from the World Council of Churches, the International Work Group for Indigenous Affairs, the United Nations Association of Denmark, and many others.

== Key Issues ==
=== Transnational Corporations ===
The WCIP holds transnational corporations responsible for the deprivation of Indigenous Nations of their self-determination - control over their own future. They are regarded as the most serious and immediate threat to the survival of the Indigenous Nations of the Fourth World.

=== Land Rights ===
The WCIP believes that the traditional land rights of Indigenous peoples worldwide have been overpowered by the domination of Colonial powers and that indigenous people no longer have the supreme and absolute power over their territories, resources or lives and have been forced to accept the Colonizer's imposed concepts of Indian Rights.

In order to rectify this injustice, the WCIP has recommended the following:

1. that the International community recognize Indigenous sovereignty and entitlement to traditional lands
2. that the UN recognize the treaties that Indigenous Nations around the world have signed as binding under International Law.
3. that the International community and the UN honour its responsibility to the Indigenous Nations of the world by establishing the necessary mechanisms and instruments to protect their rights to self-determination with their lands and resources.

== Notable people ==
- Bjarne Store-Jakobsen
- Esther Tailfeathers

== Dissolution ==
Though it made much progress for the rights of Indigenous peoples and groups, the WCIP dissolved in 1996 due to internal conflict.

The World Council of Indigenous Peoples (WCIP) fonds were transferred to Library and Archives Canada in 2002. It contains 10.52 m of textual records, 30 video cassettes, 1471 photographs, 1181 col. and 96 b&w prints, 102 col. negatives, 92 col. slides.
