= Kainai Nation =

First Nation in Alberta, Canada

Blood Tribe Kainai Nation
- Band No. 435
- Káínaa / ᖿᐟᖻᖷ
- Shield of the Kainai Nation
- People: Blackfoot
- Treaty: Treaty 7
- Headquarters: Stand Off
- Province: Alberta

Land
- Main reserve: Blood 148
- Reserve: Blood 148A
- Land area: 1,362.639 km^{2} (526.118 sq mi)

Population (2021)
- On reserve: 4,572
- Total population: 19,345

Government
- Chief: Roy Fox
- Council: Floyd Big Head; Clarence Black Water; Diandra Bruised Head; Winston Day Chief; Tony Delaney; Dorothy First Rider; Martin Heavy Head; Travis Plaited Hair; Richard Red Crow; Maria Russell; Piinaakoyim Tailfeathers; Marcel Weasel Head

Website
- bloodtribe.org

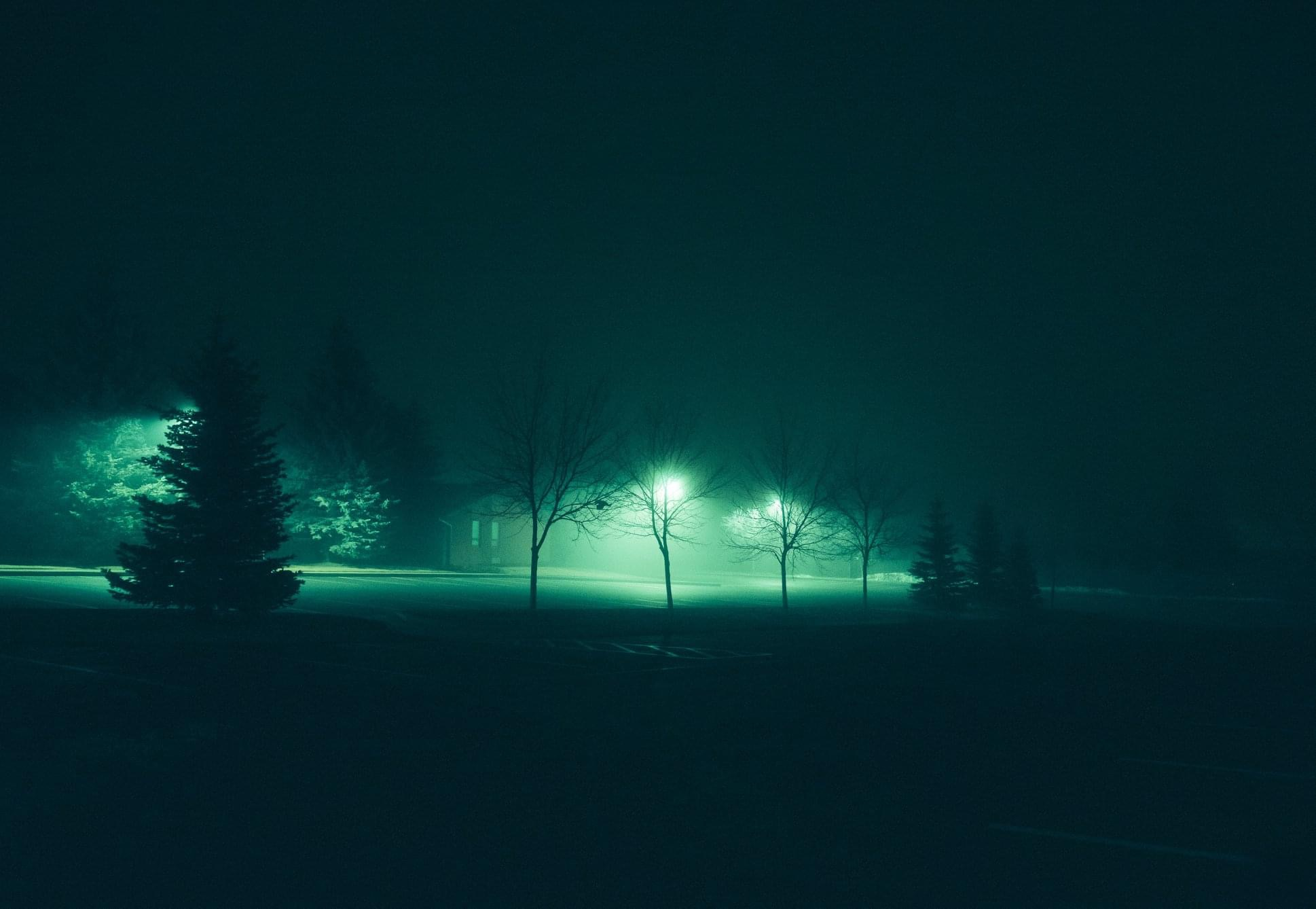
Stand Off community at night. Kainai Nation.

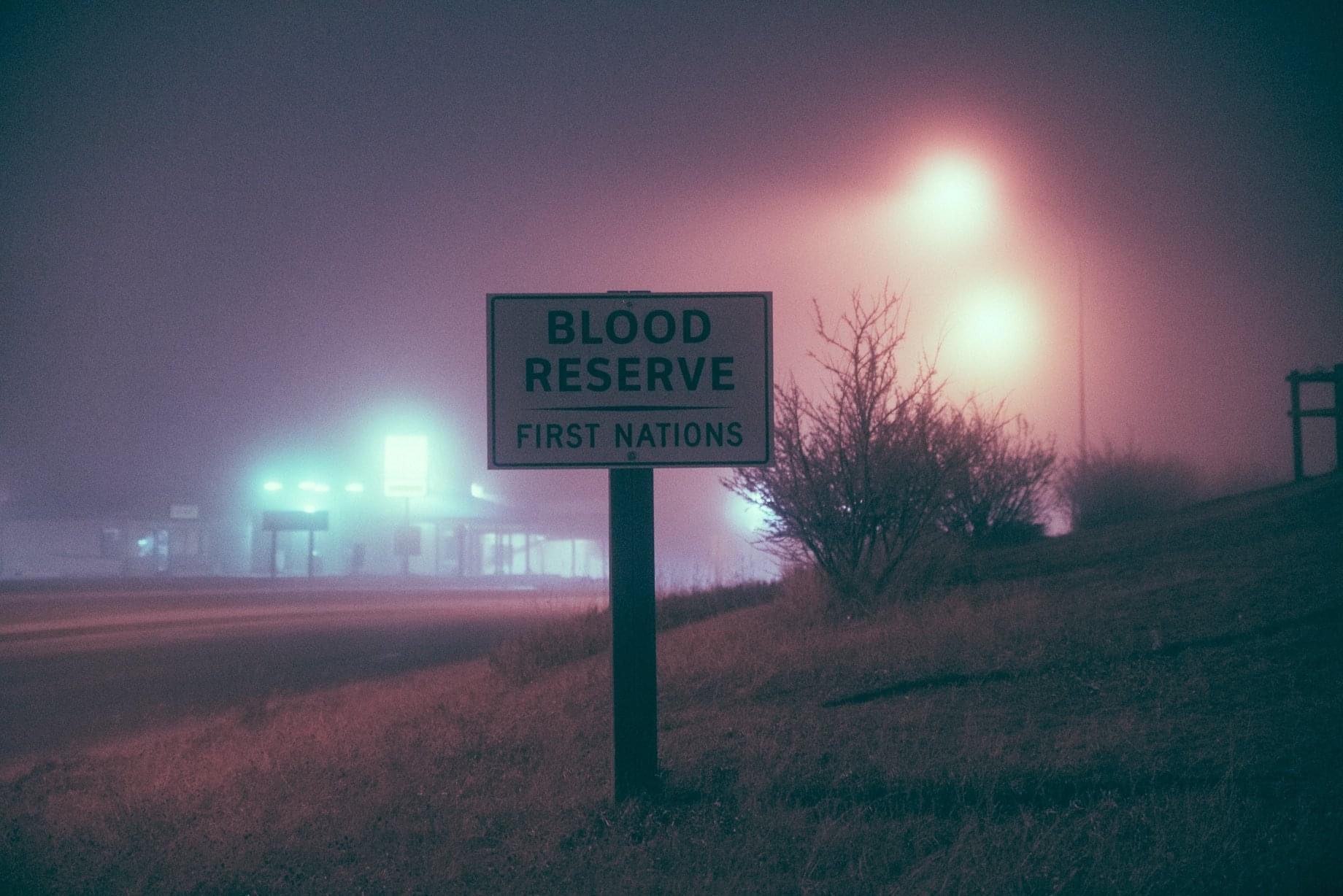
Kainai Nation entry sign

The Kainai Nation (/ˈkaɪnaɪ/ KY-ny; Blackfoot: ᖿᐟᖻ, romanized: Káínaa, pronounced [kɛ́naː], or ᖿᐟᖻᖷ, Káínawa [kɛ́nawḁ]), also known as Blood Tribe, is a First Nations band government in southern Alberta, Canada, with a population of 18,465 members in 2024, up from 11,791 in December 2013.

Akáínaa [akǽnaː] translates directly to 'many chief' (from aká, 'many' and nínaa, 'chief') while Káína translates directly to 'many chief people'. The enemy Plains Cree call the Kainai mihkowiyiniw, 'stained with blood', thus 'the bloodthirsty, cruel', therefore, the common English name for the tribe is the Blood tribe.

The Kainai speak a language of the Blackfoot linguistic group; their dialect is closely related to those of the Siksika and Piikani. They are one of three nations constituting the Blackfoot Confederacy.

At the time treaties such as Treaty 7 were signed, the Kainai were situated on the Oldman, Belly, and St. Mary rivers west of Lethbridge, Alberta. The Kainai reserve Blood 148 is currently the largest in Canada with 4,570 inhabitants on 1,410 km^{2} (545 sq mi) and is located 200 kilometres (120 mi) south of Calgary.

== Economy ==
The Kainai Nation is engaged in diverse enterprises, and they trade with domestic and international partners. Ammolite mining, for example, provides a rare highly demanded gem mineral to Asia for feng shui. Ammolite is known to be found only in the Bearpaw Formation, as unique conditions of the Campanian age were optimal for the fossilization of marine life into ammolite. Over the years, mining operations have uncovered several oceanic mosasaur fossils, which have been stored for study at the Royal Tyrrell Museum; however, they belong to the Kainai Nation.

== History ==
In September 2014 the Blood Tribe became one of the original eight signatories to the Buffalo Treaty. They also held the first buffalo dialogue in 2009 that eventually led to the creation of the treaty.

The Kainai Nation filed many specific claims with the federal government. In 2017, a federal court ruled that the Crown had underestimated the band's population, resulting in a smaller reserve than it should have been. As such, the Blood Tribe reserve could be expanded by 421 square kilometres (163 sq mi), but the community could seek a cash-in-lieu-of-land settlement for this claim instead.

In July 2019, the Kainai Nation settled a claim over Crown mismanagement of the band's ranching assets. The community received a $150 million cash settlement. Chief Roy Fox said that $123 million of this settlement will be used to develop "housing, capital works, a new administration building and a new skating rink".

== Government ==
=== Band council ===
The Kainai Nation is governed by an elected council of twelve to fifteen, with one chief. The term of office is four years. Historical chiefs of the Kainai are below:

- Last of the hereditary chiefs, Traditional Chief Jim Shot Both Sides (1956–1980)
- Chief Chris Shade (1996–2004)
- Chief Charles Weasel Head (2004–2016)
- Chief Roy Fox (Makiinimaa – Curlew) (2016–present)

Blood Tribe Councillors (2024)

1. Patrick Black Plume (Siksaapoo)
2. Clarence Black Water (Aakaota’si)
3. Kyla Crow (Komiikakato’saakii)
4. Beth Day Chief (Sapappistsa’taakii)
5. Dorothy First Rider (Iitomomahka)
6. Elliot Fox (Makoy’ooh’kinni)
7. John J. (J.J.) Little Bear (Piita’ohkamii)
8. Kirby Many Fingers (Apanssa’pi)
9. Maria Russell (Iitoominnimaakii)
10. Piinaakoyim Tailfeathers (Piinaakoyim)
11. Marcel Weasel Head (Aapao’tokaan)
12. Franklyn White Quills (Makoyaapii)

=== Police force ===
In pre-treaty times, the iikunuhkahtsi were a society responsible for the punishment of misdeeds. As of 2015 the Blood reserve was policed by the Blood Tribe Police, with 31 officers.

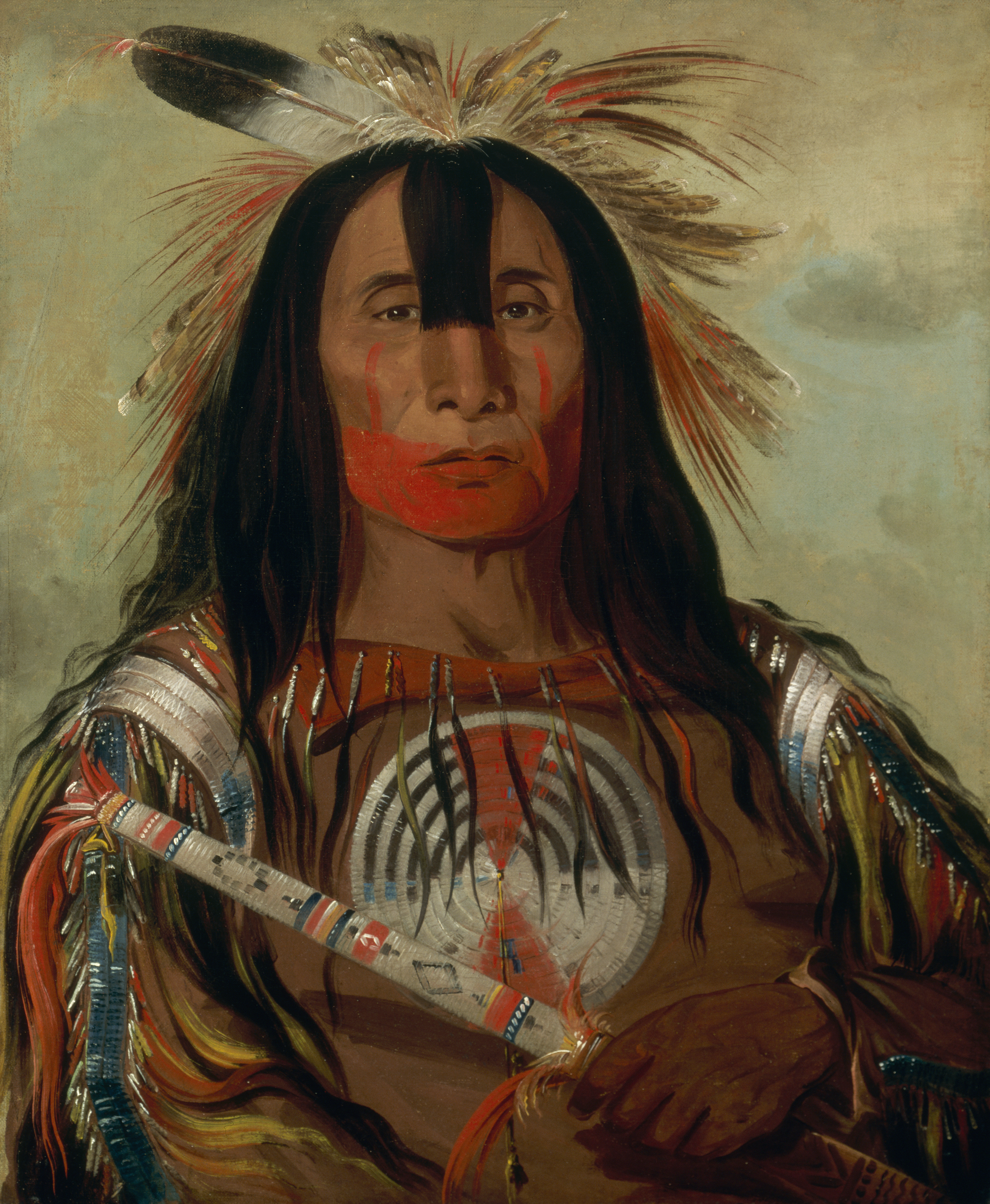
Stu-mick-o-súcks, Buffalo Bull's Back Fat, Head Chief, Blood Tribe, 1832 by George Catlin

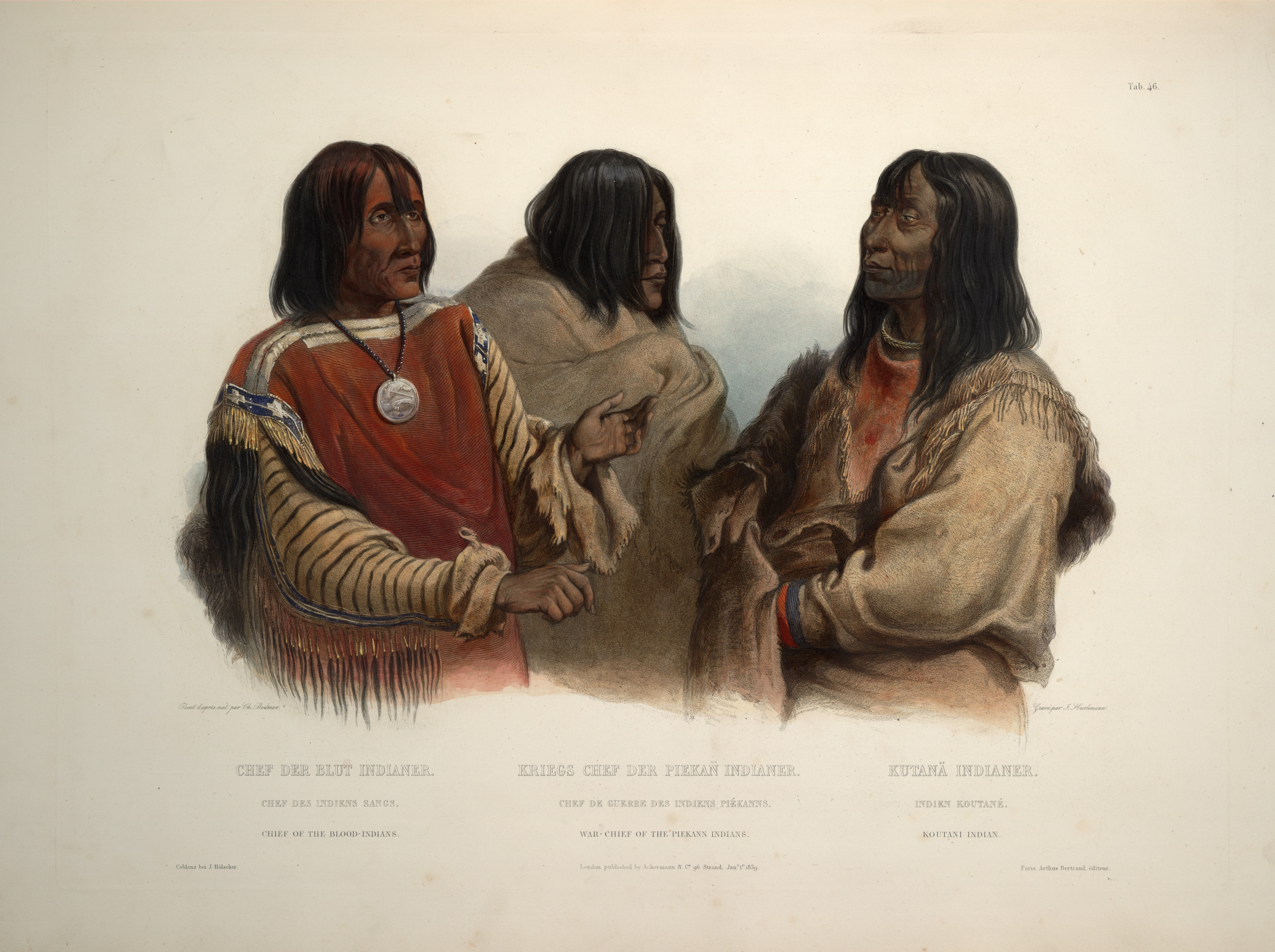
Chief of the Blood Indians, War chief of the Piekann Indians and a Koutani Indian, by Karl Bodmer

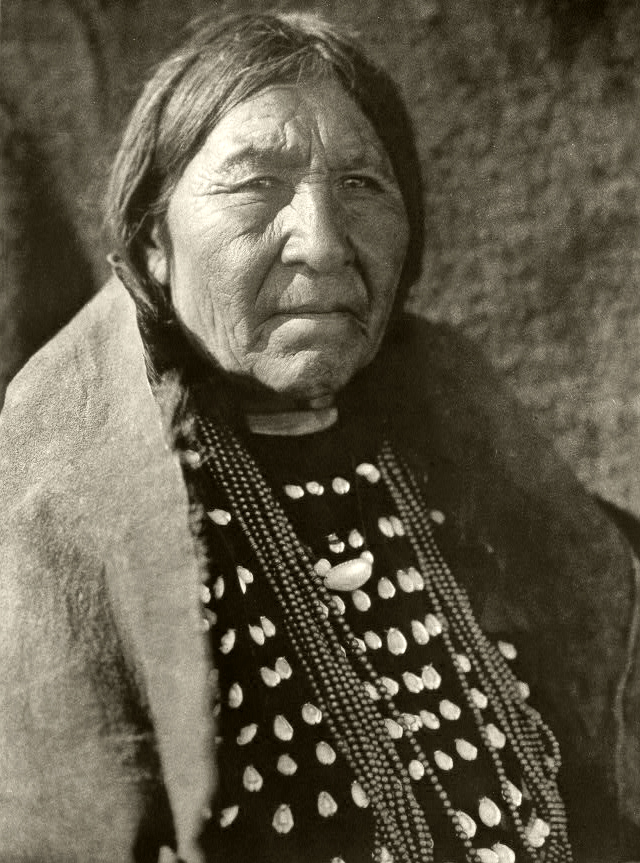
Stsimaki (Reluctant-to-be-woman) - Blood by Edward S. Curtis

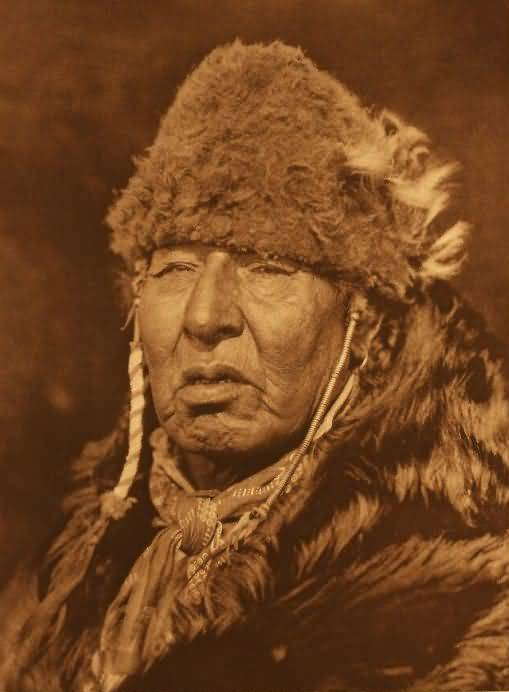
Apio-mita White Dog - Blood

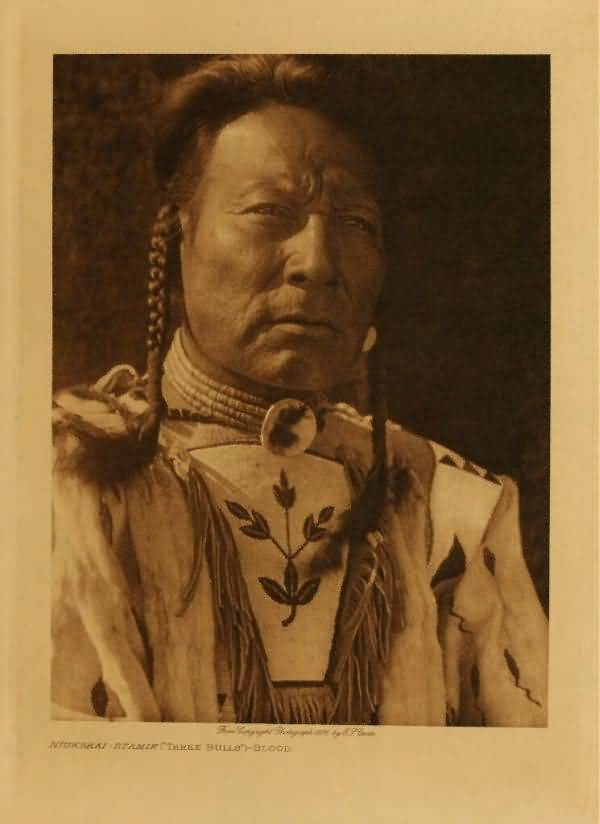
Niukskai-Stamik Three Bulls - Blood

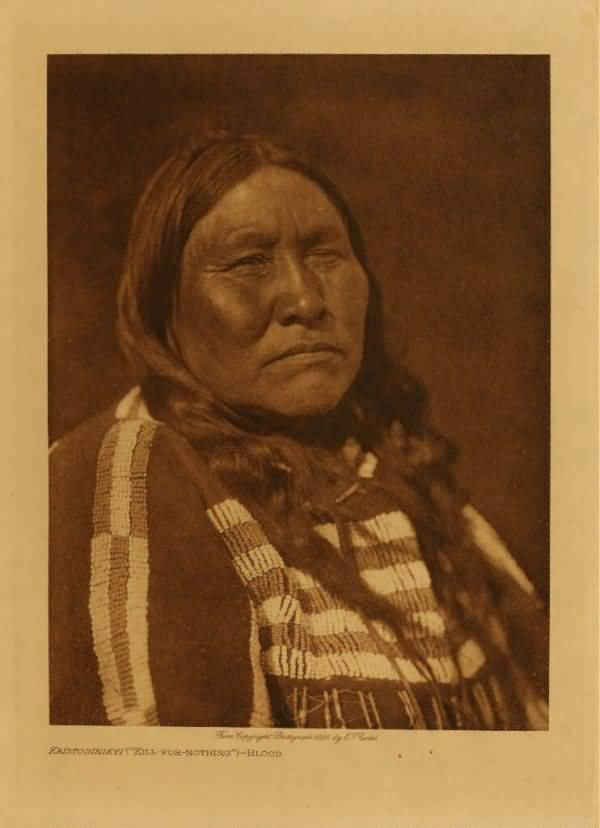
Kaistosinikyi Kill-For-Nothing - Blood

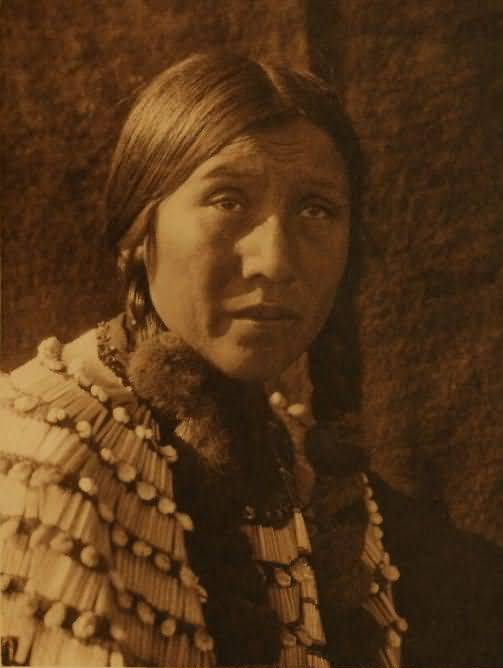
Atso Tohkomi Call-on-All-Sides - Blood

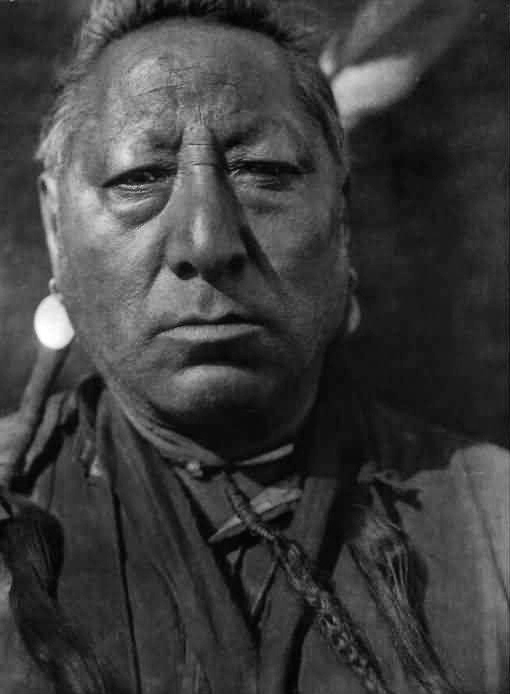
Astanighkyi Come-Singing - Blood

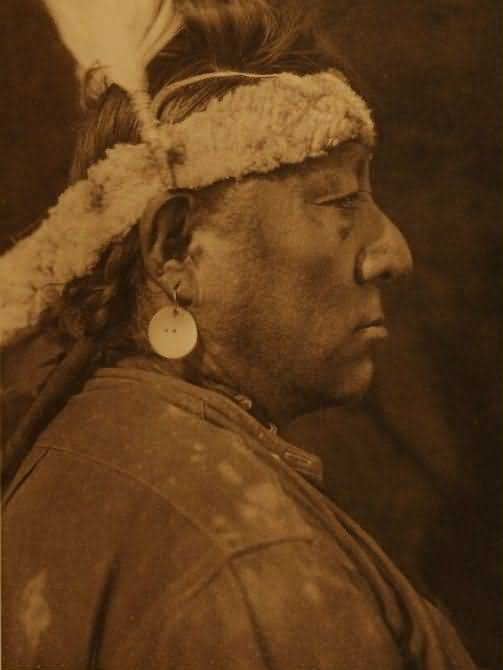
Astanighkyi Come-Singing - Blood

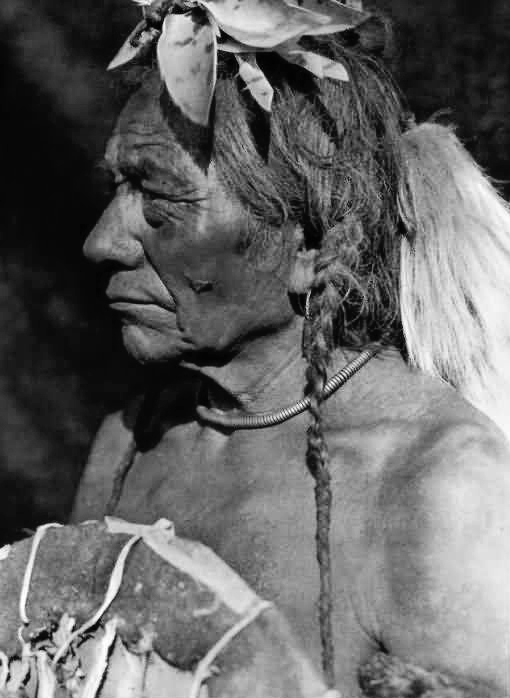
Makoyepuk Wolf-Child - Blood

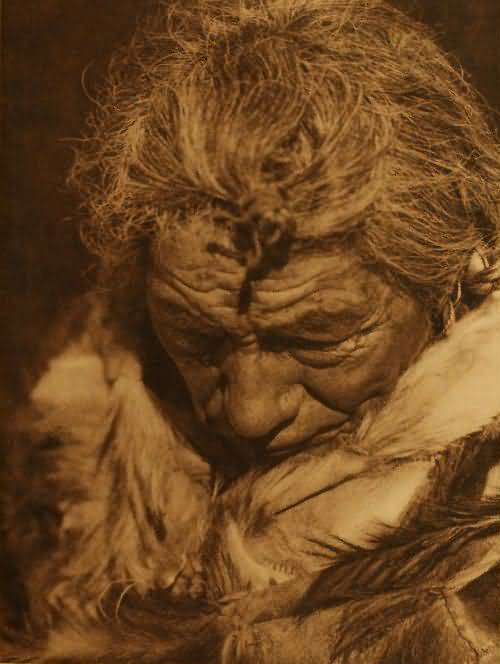
Makoyepuk Wolf-Child - Blood

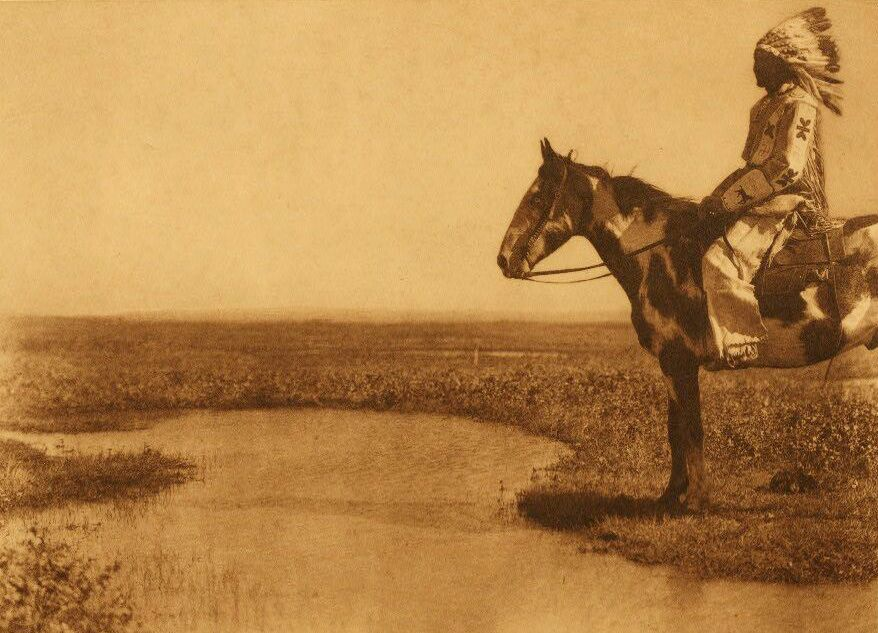
A Blood horseman

== Notable people ==
- Cherish Violet Blood - stage and film actress
- Red Crow - 1887 Treaty Number Seven Chief
- Byron Chief-Moon - performer and choreographer
- Eugene Creighton (Owns Many Horses)
- Eugene Brave Rock - actor and stunt man
- Faye HeavyShield - artist
- Marie Smallface Marule - academic administrator, activist, and educator
- Natawista Iksina (1825–1893) - interpreter and diplomat
- Jerry Potts
- Pete Standing Alone
- Elle-Máijá Tailfeathers - Kainai and Sámi actress, producer, filmmaker and curatorial assistant
- Esther Tailfeathers
- Tom Three Persons - Rodeo athlete and rancher, best known for winning the saddle bronc competition at the inaugural Calgary Stampede in 1912
- Joane Cardinal-Schubert - artist

== In popular culture ==
In 1960, the Kainai and their Sun Dance were featured in the National Film Board of Canada (NFB) documentary Circle of the Sun. Tribal leaders had been concerned that the Sun Dance might be dying out, and had permitted filming as a visual record. This documentary was later referenced by electronic music duo Boards of Canada on their debut album Music Has The Right to Children, with song titles such as "Kaini Industries" and "Pete Standing Alone" paying homage to the tribe and its leader.

In 1973, the NFB released the documentary Kainai, which discusses the construction and consequences of a factory on their property.

In 2006, community leader Rick Tailfeathers contributed a small ammolite carving of a buffalo skull to the Six String Nation project. The object was permanently mounted on the interior of Voyageur, the guitar at the heart of the project. Following a presentation about the project in September 2014 at Tatsikiisaapo'p Middle School, project creator Jowi Taylor was presented with a braid of sweet grass by school principal Ramona Big Head. The braid resides in the headstock area in the bed of the guitar case.

On National Aboriginal Day in 2011, the NFB released the Pete Standing Alone trilogy, which includes Circle of the Sun, Standing Alone and a 2010 film, Round Up, documenting 50 years of the Kainai Nation as well as the life of elder Pete Standing Alone.

== Historical newspapers ==
Kainai News, Volume 1, Issue 9, October 15, 1968

- The Kainai News was one of Canada's first aboriginal newspapers and instrumental in the history of aboriginal journalism in Canada. It was published in southern Alberta by the Blood Indian Tribe and later by Indian News Media. Content focused on a range of local issues within the reserve as well as national issues such as the Indian Act, the Whitepaper and Bill C-31. Of particular significance are editorial cartoons by Everett Soop which were a regular feature of the newspaper. Its first editor was Caen Bly, granddaughter of Senator James Gladstone.
- The Sun Dance Echo was a predecessor to the Kainai News. It was edited by Reggie Black Plume and occasionally contained articles by Hugh Dempsey.

== Communities ==
The Kainai nation communities include:

- Bullhorn / Pomiipisskian / ᑲᒍᑯᐧᖽᑉᖳᐡ
- Fish Creek / Akaomisko / ᖳᖿᐠᒍᐧᖾ
- Fort Whoop Up / Akaisakoyi / ᖳᖼᓭᖾᔪ
- Levern / Iisoitapi / ᖱᓴᐟᒣᑯ
- Moses Lake / Aakoohkiimiksi / ᖳᖾᐦᖽᒍᖽᐧ
- Old Agency / Iikaitonnioʼpi / ᖱᖼᐟᒪᖺᑉᑯ or Aakáíksamaiksi / ᖳᖼᐟᖿᐧᒉᐟᖽᐧ
- Standoff / Saípoyi / ᓯᑲᔪ or Tattsikiitapi / ᒣᒧᐧᖽᒣᑯ

== See also ==
- List of Indian reserves in Alberta
