= Esther Tailfeathers =

Canadian physician and Indigenous health advocate (born 1960/1961)

- Born: 1960 or 1961 (age 65–66)
- Spouse: Bjarne Store-Jakobsen (divorced)
- Relatives: Elle-Máijá Tailfeathers (daughter)

Esther Tailfeathers (born 1960/1961) is a Canadian physician.

Raised on teetotal tribal lands, where she observed her father's struggles with alcohol, she became the medical lead at Alberta Health Services' Indigenous Wellness Core, where she developed Indigenous Health Commitments: Roadmap to Wellness. She married Bjarne Store-Jakobsen, with whom she had a daughter and son, Elle-Máijá Tailfeathers, and Piinaakoyim Tailfeathers.

== Early life ==
Tailfeathers was born in 1960 or 1961 and is a member of the Kainai First Nation. She grew up on tribal lands, where alcohol is prohibited, and recalls other community members becoming bootleggers to earn money. She recalls at the age of 12 driving her father to the bootlegger's so he could buy gin to help with a hangover. Her father stopped drinking in the early 1980s after a court order to do so. Tailfeathers has described her approach to treating addiction as informed by her father's struggles with alcohol.

She earned a bachelor's degree in Native American Studies from the University of Lethbridge, before marrying Bjarne Store-Jakobsen, whom she had met at the 1981 World Council of Indigenous Peoples assembly in Australia, and moving to Norway. After the death of her brother, who had been a medical student and had encouraged her to study medicine, she earned a medical degree at the University of North Dakota and did a residency in family medicine at the University of Alberta.

== Career ==
Tailfeathers moved back to Alberta in 2000. She worked in the emergency department on Montana's Blackfeet Reservation in Montana and in Alberta's Fort Chipewyan, before becoming a family physician on the Blood Tribe, where she also lived. She became the medical lead at Alberta Health Services' (AHS) Indigenous Wellness Core (IWC), where she was instrumental in developing Indigenous Health Commitments: Roadmap to Wellness. She resigned in 2023 after a job offer to Deena Hinshaw to become the IWC's public health and preventive medicine lead was revoked by AHS after protests by Albertans who disagreed with Hinshaw's COVID-19 decisions while she was Alberta's top doctor. Tailfeathers said the revoking of the job offer would negatively impact the health of Indigenous people in Alberta and the politicization of the decision would impact Alberta's ability to recruit physicians.

In 2019, Tailfeathers was awarded the Dr. Thomas Dignan Indigenous Health Award for her contribution to improved Indigenous health care in Canada. In 2023 the University of Lethbridge gave her an honorary degree.

== Personal life ==
Tailfeathers is the mother of Norwegian-Canadian filmmaker Elle-Máijá Tailfeathers. She and her former husband, Sami politician Store-Jakobsen, are the subject of their daughter's 2014 film Bihttoš (Rebel). The film, narrated by Elle-Maija Tailfeathers, details the couple's "mythical love story" after they met at the 1981 World Council of Indigenous Peoples assembly in Australia and the family's struggles, which eventually ended in their divorce.
