= Stand Off, Alberta =

Stand Off
- Locality
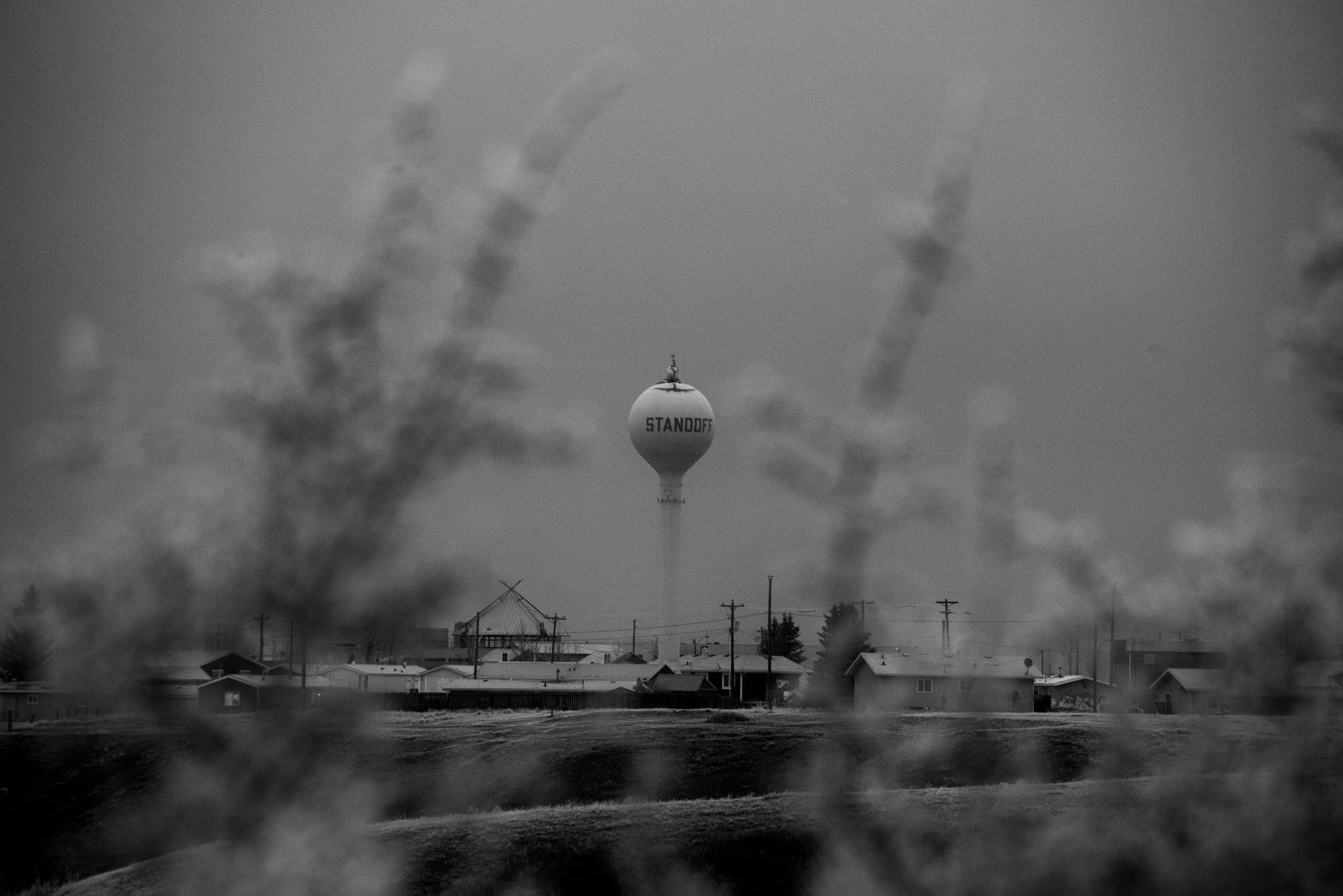
- Stand Off community water tower

- Location of Stand Off in Alberta Stand Off (Canada)
- Coordinates: 49.274°N 113.184°W
- Country: Canada
- Province: Alberta
- Region: Southern Alberta
- Planning region: South Saskatchewan

Population
  - Total: 682
- Time zone: UTC−06:00 (Alberta Time)

Stand Off (Tattsikiitapi / ᒣᒧᐧᖽᒣᑯ or Saípoyi / ᓯᑲᔪ) is an unincorporated community in southern Alberta, Canada within the Blood (Kainai) reserve. It is on Highway 2, approximately 43 km (27 miles) southwest of Lethbridge and 30 km (19 mi) north of Cardston. The people living in Stand Off and on the reserve are a part of the Blackfoot Nation of Canada and the United States. The Blood Tribe (Nation) has the largest landmass in all eleven Numbered Treaties in Canada, (1871–1921).

== Education ==
Stand Off is home to Red Crow Community College founded in 1986. The institution has had more than 2000 graduates since its opening, representing 16 percent of the reserve population.

== Demographics ==
Stand Off recorded a population of 682 in the 1991 Census of Population conducted by Statistics Canada.

== Notable people ==
- Eugene Brave Rock (born c. 1978), an actor and stuntman, was born and raised in Stand Off.
- Charley Russell, American Artist, lived there and painted scenes of the Bloods in 1888-89.

== Gallery ==
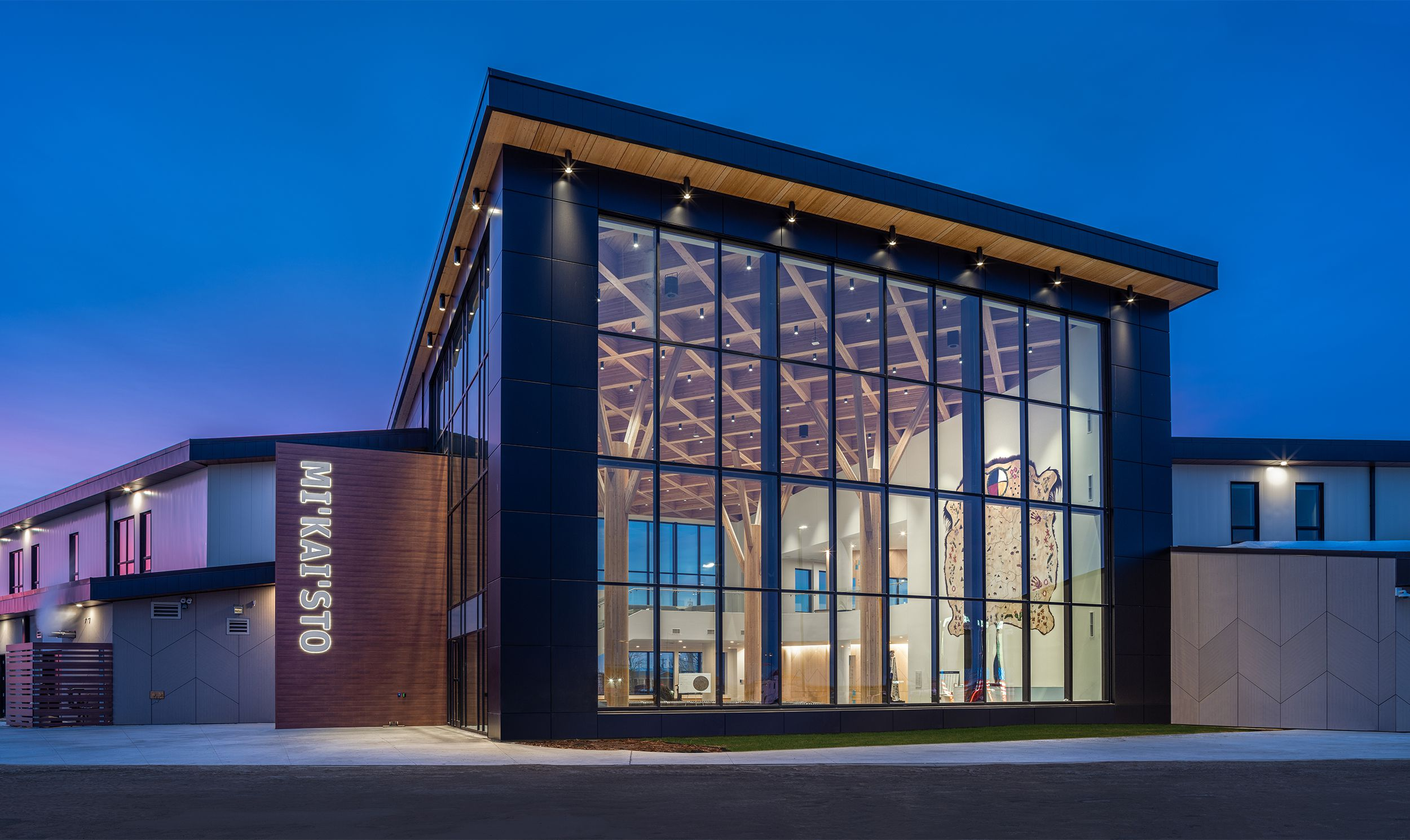
Red Crow College Main Campus

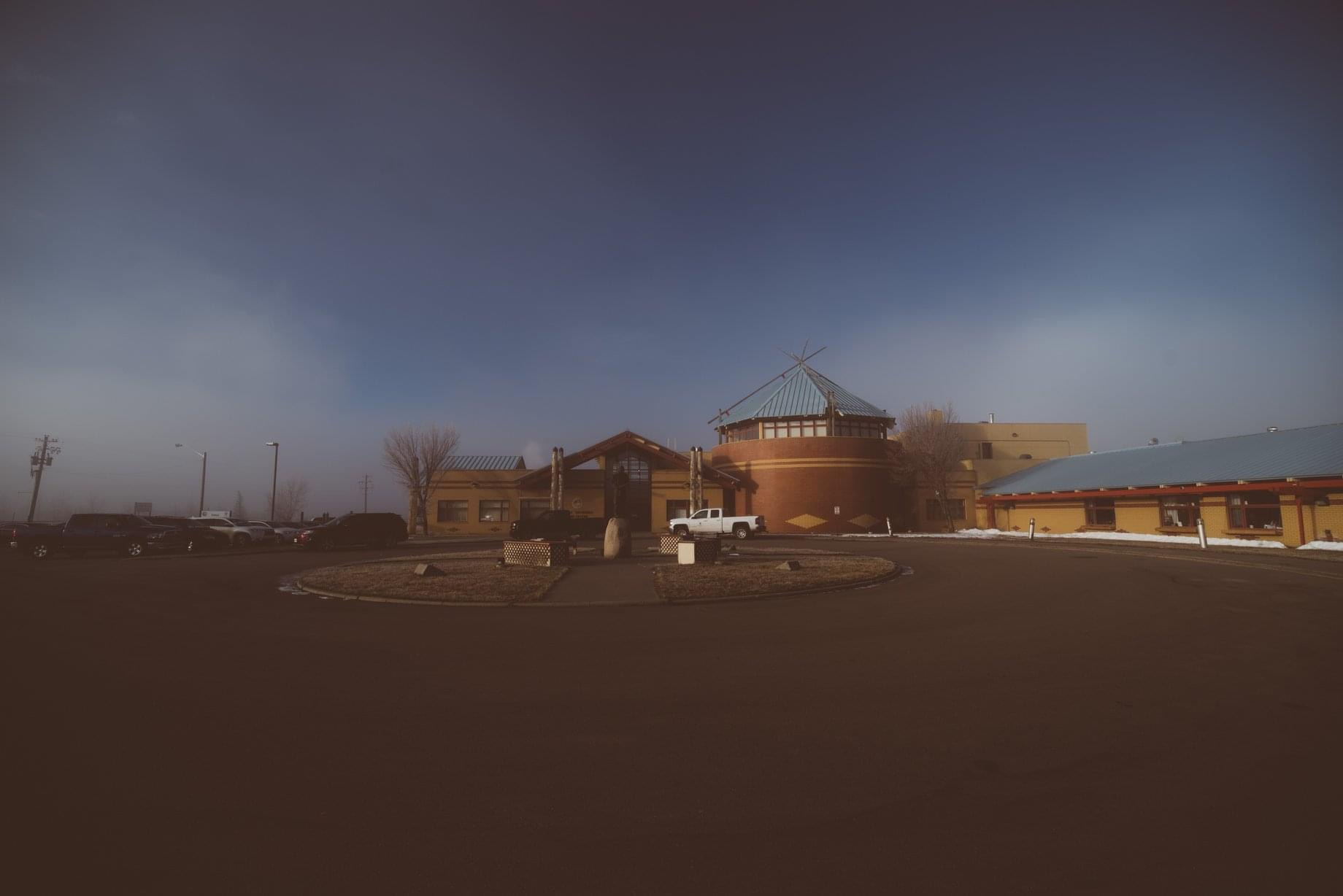
Stand-Off Health Centre
