= Blood 148 =

Coordinates: 49.5°N 113.2°W

- Indian reserve
- Blood Indian Reserve No. 148
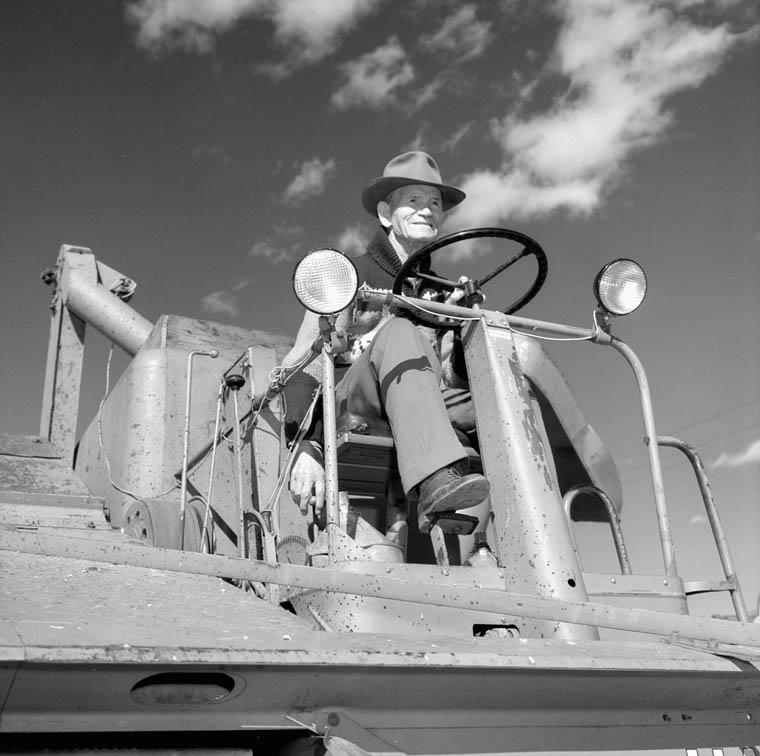
- James Gladstone on his combine harvester

- Location in Alberta
- First Nation: Kainai Nation
- Country: Canada
- Province: Alberta
- Municipal district: Cardston
- Headquarters: Stand Off

Government
  - Body: Blood Tribe Council
  - Chief: Traveller Plaited Hair (Aakaayaamihtsinima)

Area
  - Total: 1,413.87 km^{2} (545.90 sq mi)

Population (2021)
  - Total: 4,572
- Time zone: UTC−06:00 (Alberta Time)
- Area code: 403
- Highways: Highway 2 Highway 5 Highway 509
- Website: bloodtribe.org

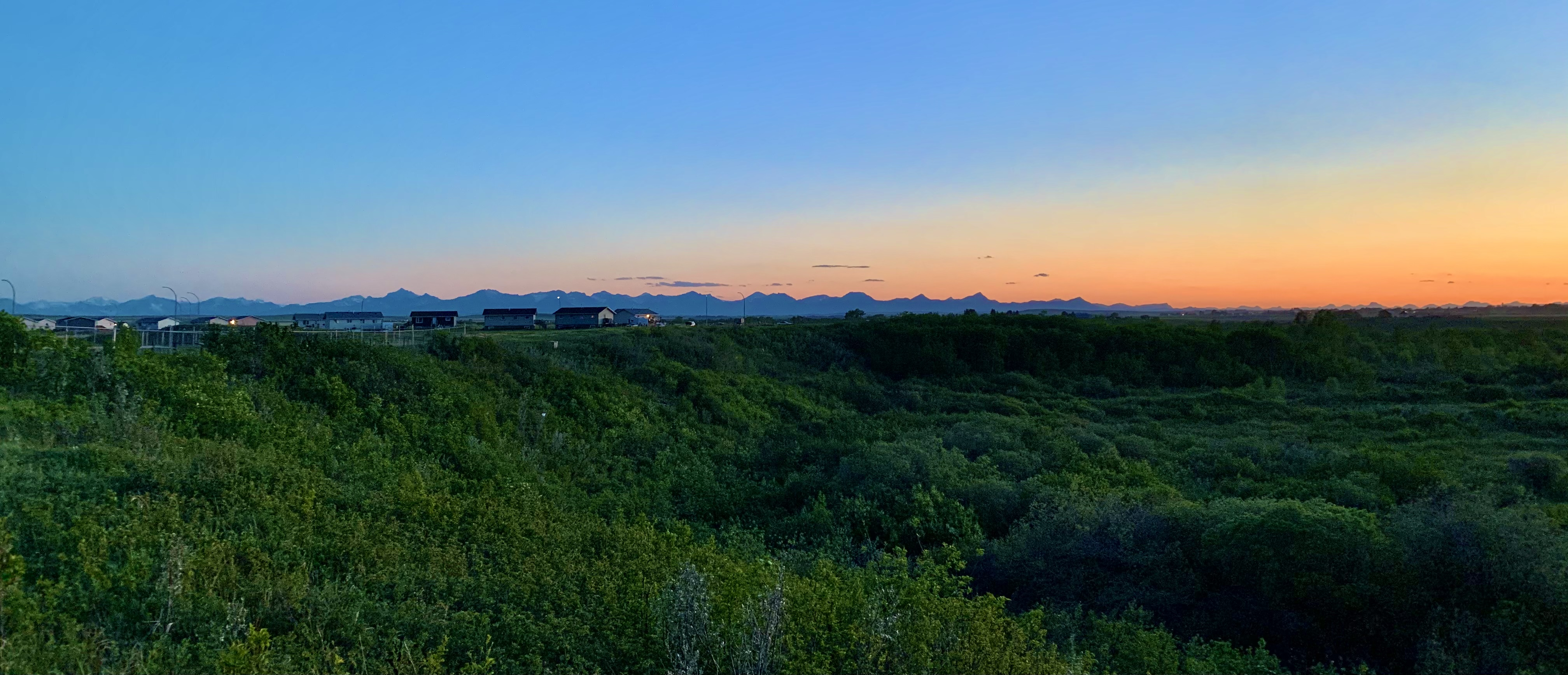
Levern Community.

Blood 148 is a First Nations reserve in Alberta, Canada. It is inhabited by the Blood (Kainai) First Nation and was established under the provisions of Treaty 7. This reserve is managed from the community of Stand Off on its northwest border and encompasses the majority of lands bounded by the city of Lethbridge and the towns of Fort Macleod and Cardston. It is traversed by Alberta Highway 2, Highway 5, and Highway 509. The St. Mary River and the Belly River are major rivers supplying and draining the lands.

At 1,413.87 km^{2} (545.90 sq mi), the Blood 148 reserve is the largest reserve by land in Canada, and the third most populous after Six Nations and Akwesasne. On June 12, 2019, federal courts ruled that, according to the land entitlement provisions of Treaty 7, the Blood Tribe was entitled to a reserve equal to 710 square miles (1,800 km^{2}) in area, an increase of 164.1 square miles (425 km^{2}) over the existing lands. The judgement did not address remedy nor costs. It is located between Fort Macleod, Lethbridge, and Cardston, bordering the Municipal District of Willow Creek No. 26 to the northwest, the Lethbridge County to the northeast and Cardston County to the east, south and southwest.

== Demographics ==
In 2006, Blood 148 had a population of 4,177 living in 1,250 dwellings, an 8.4% increase from 2001. The Alberta Government lists the Blood 148 population at 4,713 in 2018. Prior to the June 12, 2019 award the Indian reserve land area was 1,413.87 km^{2} (545.90 sq mi), with a population density of 3.0/km^{2} (7.8/sq mi).

As of December 2013, the Blood 435 band, based on reserves 148 and 148A, had a total registered population of 11,791 per AANDC sources.

== Government ==
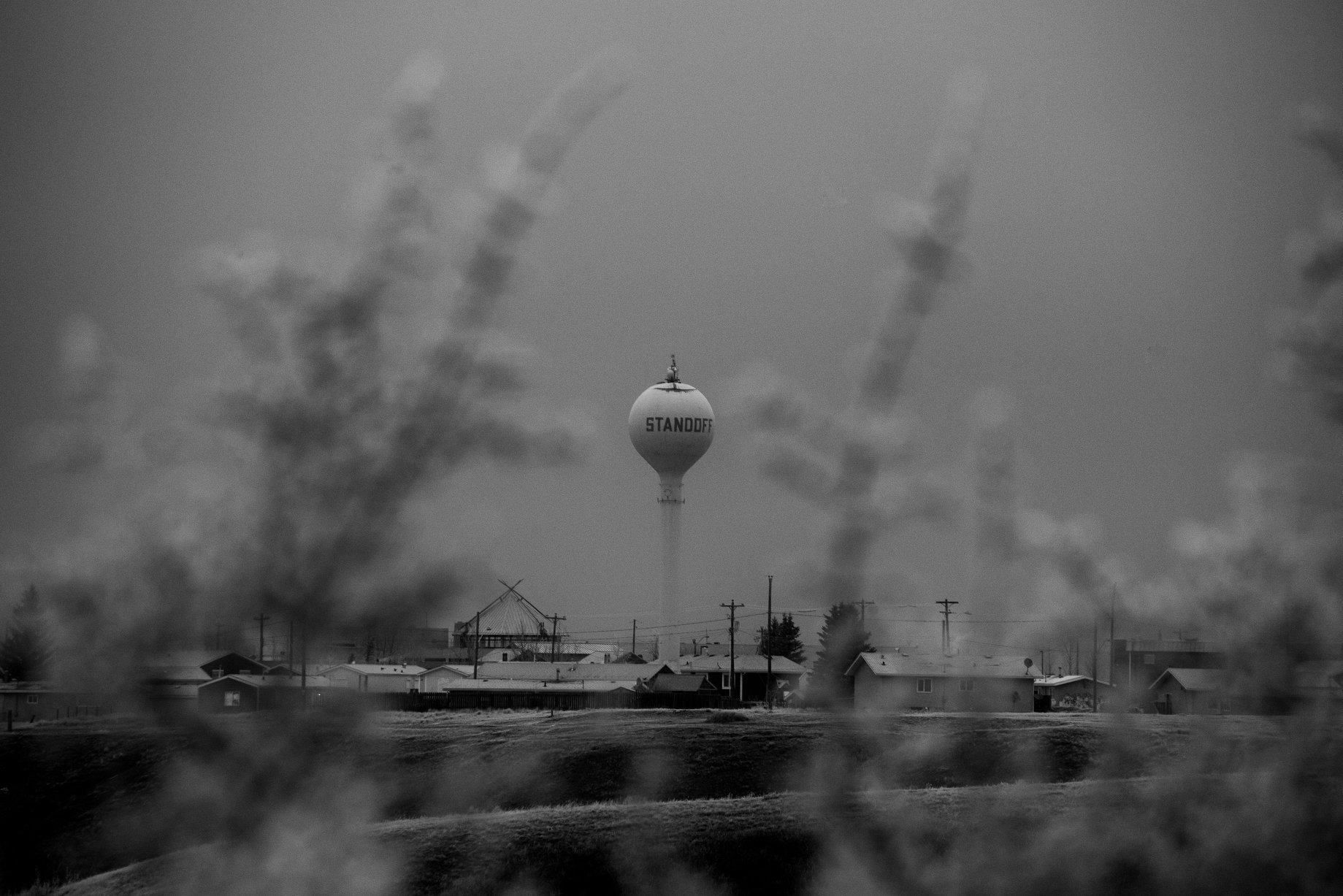
Stand-Off community water tower

Under the Constitution Act, 1867, legislative authority over Indian reserves is placed exclusively with the national parliament and specifically Crown–Indigenous Relations and Northern Affairs Canada. The reserve is governed by a tribal council led by Chief Traveller Plaited Hair (Aakaayaamihtsinima) (2024–present).

Blood Tribe Councillors (2024)

1. Patrick Black Plume (Siksaapoo)
2. Clarence Black Water (Aakaota’si)
3. Kyla Crow (Komiikakato’saakii)
4. Beth Day Chief (Sapappistsa’taakii)
5. Dorothy First Rider (Iitomomahka)
6. Elliot Fox (Makoy’ooh’kinni)
7. John J. (J.J.) Little Bear (Piita’ohkamii)
8. Kirby Many Fingers (Apanssa’pi)
9. Maria Russell (Iitoominnimaakii)
10. Piinaakoyim Tailfeathers (Piinaakoyim)
11. Marcel Weasel Head (Aapao’tokaan)
12. Franklyn White Quills (Makoyaapii)

== See also ==
- Beverly Hungry Wolf, writer
- List of Indian reserves in Alberta
