= Blackfoot language =

Algonquian language spoken in North America

Siksika
- Niitsíʼpowahsin (ᖹᒧᐧᑲᖷᐦᓱᐡ); Siksiká (ᓱᖽᐧᖿ); Siksikáíʼpowahsin (ᓱᖽᐧᖼᐟᑲᖷᐦᓱᐡ)
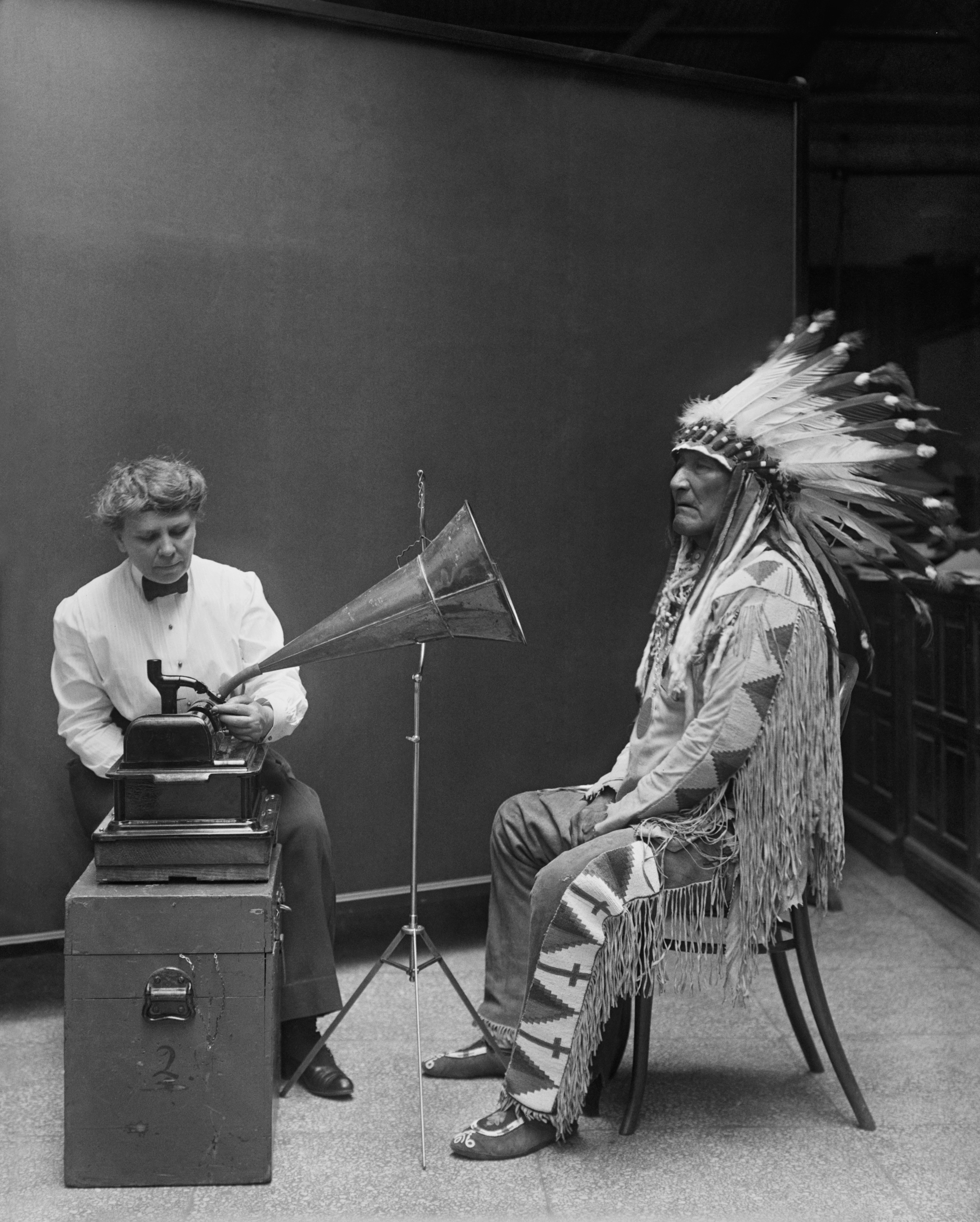
- Frances Densmore in an interpreting session with Blackfoot chief Mountain Chief in 1916
- Pronunciation: [niːt͡síʔpoʊxsɪn] [sɪksiká] [sɪksikéɪ́ʔpoʊxsɪn]
- Native to: Canada, United States
- Region: Piikani Nation, Siksika Nation, and Kainai Nation in southern Alberta; Blackfeet Nation in Montana
- Ethnicity: Blackfoot
- Native speakers: 2,900 (2016)
- Language family: Algic: Algonquian; Siksika
- Dialects: Siksiká (ᓱᖽᐧᖿ); Káínai (ᖿᐟᖻ); Aapátohsipikani (ᖳᑫᒪᐦᓱᑯᖿᖹ); Aamsskáápipikani (ᖳᐢᐧᖿᑯᑯᖿᖹ)
- Writing system: Blackfoot Syllabics; Latin

Language codes
- ISO 639-2: bla
- ISO 639-3: bla
- Glottolog: siks1238
- ELP: Niitsipowahsin
- Blackfoot is classified as Definitely Endangered by the UNESCO Atlas of the World's Languages in Danger.

- People: Niitsítapi (ᖹᒧᐧᒣᑯ)
- Language: Niitsíʼpowahsin (ᖹᒧᐧᑲᖷᐦᓱᐡ)
- Country: Nitáwahsinnaani (ᖹᒣᖷᐦᓱᖻᖹ)

Blackfoot, also called Niitsíʼpowahsin (ᖹᒧᐧᑲᖷᐦᓱᐡ) or Siksiká (/ˈsɪksəkə/ SIK-sə-kə; Blackfoot: [sɪksiká], ᓱᖽᐧᖿ), is an Algonquian language spoken by the Blackfoot or Niitsitapi people, who currently live in the northwestern plains of North America. There are four dialects, three of which are spoken in Alberta, Canada, and one of which is spoken in the United States: Siksiká / ᓱᖽᐧᖿ (Blackfoot), to the southeast of Calgary, Alberta; Kainai / ᖿᐟᖻ (Blood, Many Chiefs), spoken in Alberta between Cardston and Lethbridge; Aapátohsipikani / ᖳᑫᒪᐦᓱᑯᖿᖹ (Northern Piegan), to the west of Fort MacLeod which is Brocket (Piikani) and Aamsskáápipikani / ᖳᐢᐧᖿᑯᑯᖿᖹ (Southern Piegan), in northwestern Montana. The name Blackfoot probably comes from the blackened soles of the leather shoes that the people wore.

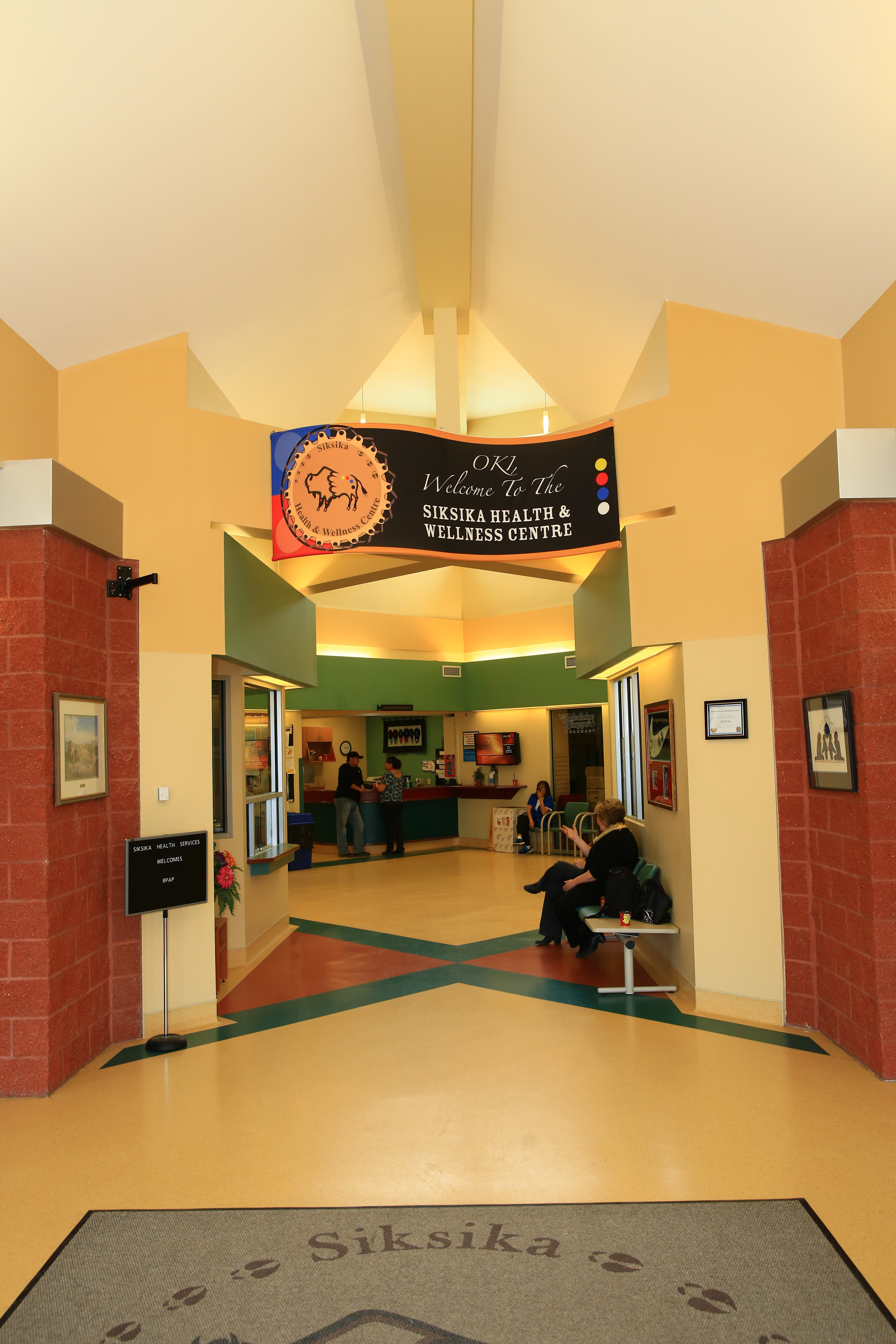
A sign at the Siksika Health and Wellness Centre in Siksika 146 reads "Oki", a Blackfoot greeting.

There is a distinct difference between Old Blackfoot (also called High Blackfoot), the dialect spoken by many older speakers, and New Blackfoot (also called Modern Blackfoot), the dialect spoken by younger speakers. Among the Algonquian languages, Blackfoot is relatively divergent in phonology and lexicon. The language has a fairly small phoneme inventory, consisting of 11 basic consonants and three basic vowels that have contrastive length counterparts. Blackfoot is a pitch accent language. Blackfoot language has been declining in the number of native speakers and is classified as either a threatened or endangered language, depending on the source used.

Like the other Algonquian languages, Blackfoot is considered to be a polysynthetic language due to its large morpheme inventory and word internal complexity. A majority of Blackfoot morphemes have a one–to–one correspondence between form and meaning, a defining feature of agglutinative languages. However, Blackfoot does display some fusional characteristics as there are morphemes that are polysemous. Both noun and verb stems cannot be used bare but must be inflected. Due to its morphological complexity, Blackfoot has a flexible word order.

The Blackfoot language has experienced a substantial decrease in speakers since the 1960s and is classified as "definitely endangered" by the UNESCO Atlas of the World's Languages in Danger. In Canada, this loss has been attributed largely to residential schools, where Indigenous students were often punished severely for speaking their first languages. Widespread language loss can also be attributed to the Sixties Scoop, through which thousands of Indigenous children were taken from their families, often without parental consent, and relocated by the government into non-Indigenous families. As a result of these losses, the Blackfoot community has launched numerous language revitalization efforts, include the Piikani Traditional Knowledge Services and many more.

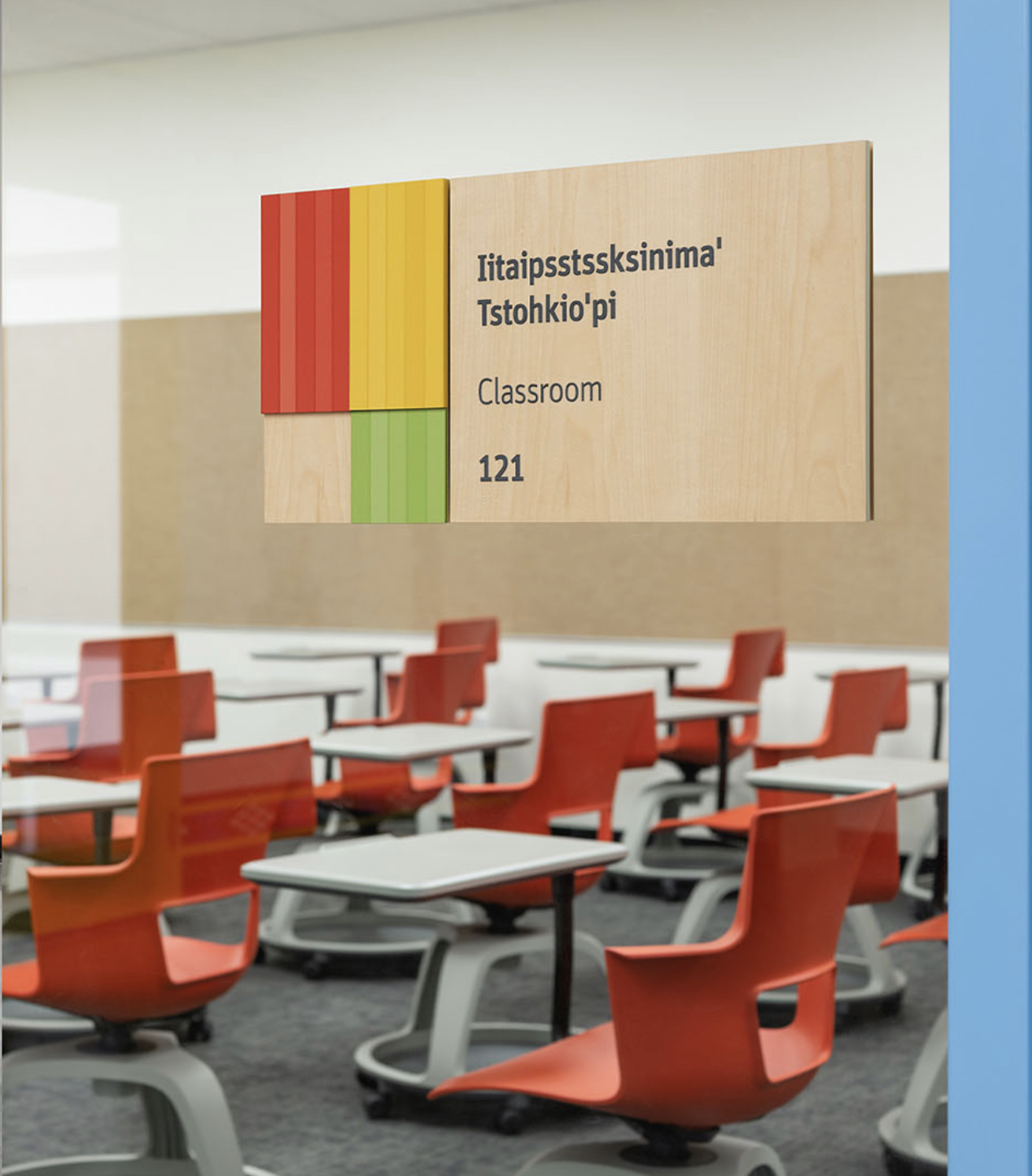
Bilingual signage in Blackfoot and English at Red Crow Community College

== Language variations ==
=== Dialects ===
The four main Blackfoot dialects are Siksiká (ᓱᖽᐧᖿ), Káínai (ᖿᐟᖻ), Aapátohsipikani (ᖳᑫᒪᐦᓱᑯᖿᖹ), and Aamsskáápipikani (ᖳᐢᐧᖿᑯᑯᖿᖹ). Some words are different in each dialect, for example: potato, in the Kainai dialect is maatááki but in Piikani dialect is paatááki, and another example: coffee, in Blackfoot dialects in Canada, is niitáʼpaisiksikimi but in the Aamsskáápipikani dialect is áísiksikimi.

Siksiká / ᓱᖽᐧᖿ	Aapátohsipikani (Piikáni) / ᖳᑫᒪᐦᓱᑯᖿᖹ (ᑯᖿᖹ)	Káínai / ᖿᐟᖻ	Aamsskáápipikani / ᖳᐢᐧᖿᑯᑯᖿᖹ	English
Maatááki	Paatááki	Maatááki	Paatááki	Potato
Niitáʼpaisiksikimi	Niitáʼpaisiksikimi	Niitáʼpaisiksikimi	Áísiksikimi	Coffee
Siksikimi / Áísoyoopoksiikimi	Siksikimi	Siksikimi	Áísoyoopoksiikimi	Tea
Anááyi	Iinán	Iinán	Iinán	Banana

There is also minor grammatical and phonological differentiation between dialects.

=== Old and New Blackfoot ===
During language revitalization courses educators frequently had situations where the Blackfoot the students learnt from their older relatives was different from the modern Blackfoot they were being taught. The modern variety's words are usually contracted compared to the older varieties.

Old Blackfoot	New Blackfoot	English
nitáʼpaisiksikimi	nitáʼpsiksikimi	coffee
nomohtoʼtoo	nitohtoʼtoo / nitomohtoʼtoo / nimohtoʼtoo	I arrive [from somewhere] or I am from
aikííwatsiksi	áíkiiwa	What is she doing?
nitáákiiyi	niistóówa áákiiwa	I am a woman

=== Written and spoken Blackfoot ===
Some words are written in their uncontracted forms while in everyday spoken speech they are instead presented in their contracted forms, these spoken aside from being contracted are also less morphologically compositional than their written forms.

Written Blackfoot	Spoken Blackfoot	English
tsá anistapiiwa?	tsistapii?	What is it?
kitákitamáttsin!	kiátamáttsin!	Good bye! [See you later!]
nitáákitapoo	táákitapoo	I am going there

== Classification ==
Blackfoot is a member of the Algonquian language family belonging to the Plains areal grouping along with Arapaho, Gros Ventre, and Cheyenne. Blackfoot is spoken in Northwestern Montana and throughout Alberta, Canada, making it geographically one of the westernmost Algonquian languages.

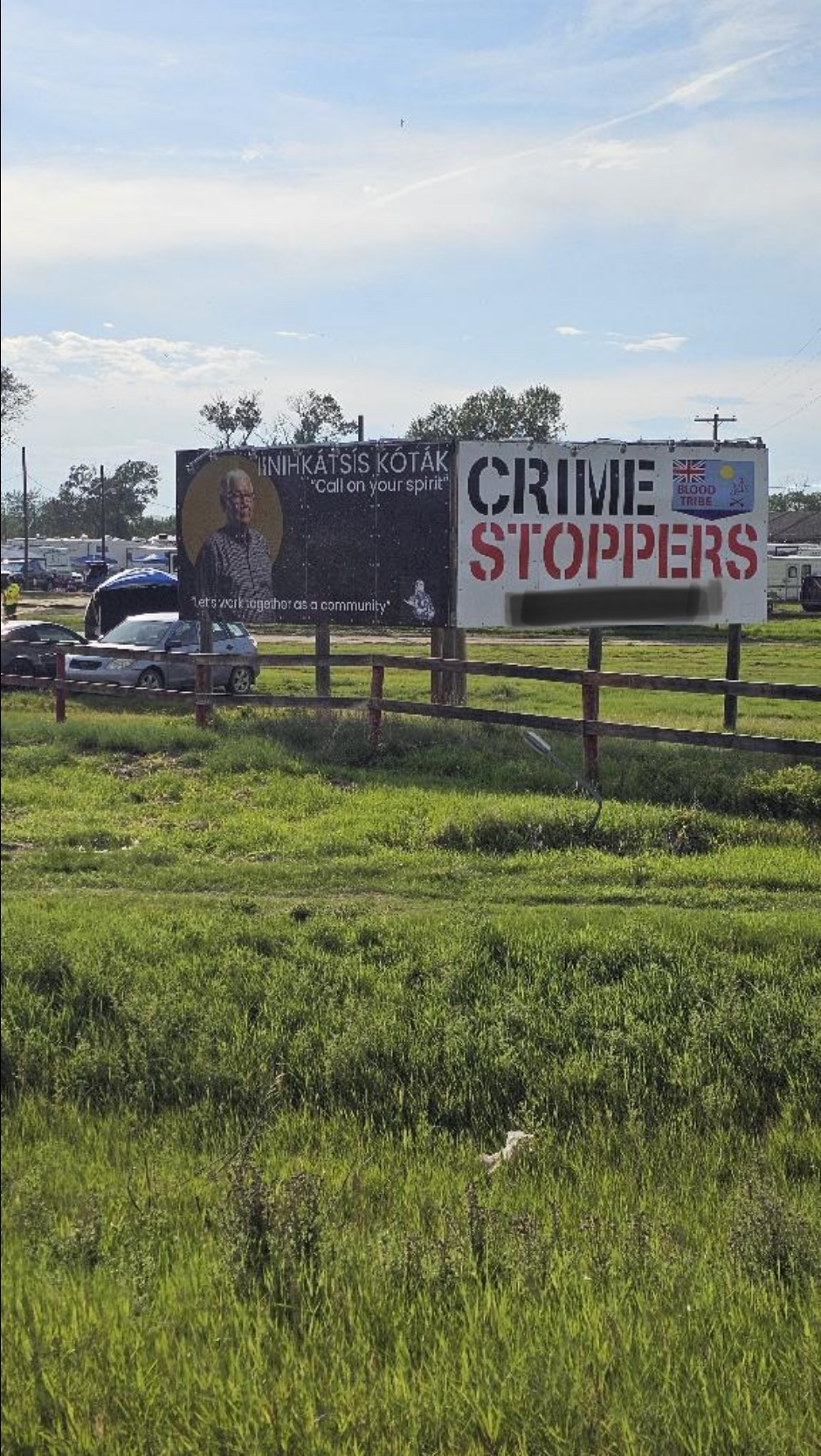
Bilingual Signs of Blackfoot and English at Red Crow Park in Kainai Nation. One reads "Iinihkátsís Kóták" meaning: Call on your spirit.

== History ==
The Blackfoot people had been one of many Native American nations that inhabited the Great Plains west of the Mississippi River. The people were bison hunters, with settlements in what is now the northern United States and southern Canada. Forced to move because of wars with neighboring tribes, the Blackfoot people settled all around the plains area, eventually concentrating in what is now Montana and Alberta. Blackfoot hunters would track and hunt game, while the remaining people would gather food, and other necessities for the winter. The northern plains, where the Blackfoot settled, had harsh winters, and the flat land provided little escape from the winds. The Blackfoot Nation thrived, along with many other native groups, until the European settlers arrived in the late eighteenth century. The settlers brought with them horses and technology, but also disease and weapons. Diseases like smallpox, foreign to the natives, decimated the Blackfoot population in the mid-nineteenth century. Groups of Blackfoot people, such as Mountain Chief's tribe, rebelled against the Europeans. But in 1870, a tribe of peaceful Blackfoot were mistaken for the rebellious tribe and hundreds were slaughtered. Over the next thirty years, settlers eradicated the bison from the Great Plains. This took away the main element of the Blackfoot economy and the people's ability to be self-sustaining. With their main food source gone, the Blackfoot were forced to rely on government support.

In 1886, the Old Sun Residential School opened on the Siksika Reserve in Alberta. In 1908, it was described by an official survey as "unsanitary" and "unsuitable in every way for such an institution". Regardless, it remained operational until its closure in 1971. Dozens of Blackfoot children died while attending. The school was rife with physical, sexual, and psychological abuse, which left a lasting impact on the Blackfoot children who attended. The trauma endured by students, as well as the subsequent repression of their Indigenous language and culture, has been credited, in part, with the loss in the number of Blackfoot speakers.

== Phonology ==
=== Consonants ===
Blackfoot has nineteen consonants, of which all but /ʔ x j w/ form pairs distinguished by length. One of the two affricates /k͡s/ is unusual for being heterorganic. Blackfoot has several allophones: for example, /x/ has many allophones. [ç] is an allophone of /x/ when it occurs after /i/ or /ɪ/. And [h] is an allophone of /x/ when it occurs at the beginning of a word.

	Labial		Coronal		Dorsal		Glottal
	short	long	short	long	short	long	Glottal
Nasal	m ⟨m⟩	mː ⟨mm⟩	n ⟨n⟩	nː ⟨nn⟩			
Plosive	p ⟨p⟩	pː ⟨pp⟩	t ⟨t⟩	tː ⟨tt⟩	k ⟨k⟩	kː ⟨kk⟩	ʔ ⟨ʼ⟩
Affricate			t͡s ⟨ts⟩	t͡sː ⟨tss⟩	k͡s ⟨ks⟩	k͡sː ⟨kss⟩	
Fricative			s ⟨s⟩	sː ⟨ss⟩	x ⟨h⟩		
Approximant	w ⟨w⟩				j ⟨y⟩		

- phonemic velars become palatals after front vowels.
- /t͡s, k͡s, k͡sː/ are phonetically considered affricates.

=== Vowels ===
==== Monophthongs ====
Blackfoot has a vowel system with three monophthongs, /i o a/.

	Front		Central		Back	
	short	long	short	long	short	long
Close	i ⟨i⟩	iː ⟨ii⟩			o ⟨o⟩	oː ⟨oo⟩
Open			a ⟨a⟩	aː ⟨aa⟩		

The short monophthongs exhibit allophonic changes as well:

- /a o/ are raised to [ʌ] and [ʊ] ~ [u] respectively when followed by a long consonant.
- /i/ becomes [ɪ] in closed syllables.

==== Diphthongs ====
There are three additional diphthongs in Blackfoot. The first diphthong ai is pronounced [ɛ] before a long consonant, [ei] (or [ai], in the dialect of the Blackfoot Reserve) before /i/ or /ʔ/, and elsewhere is pronounced [æ] in the Blood Reserve dialect or [ei] in the Blackfoot Reserve dialect. The second diphthong ao is pronounced [au] before /ʔ/ and [ɔ] elsewhere. The third diphthong oi may be pronounced [y] before a long consonant and as [oi] elsewhere.

=== Length ===
Length is contrastive in Blackfoot for both vowels and consonants. Vowel length refers to the duration of a vowel and not a change in quality. The vowel /oo/ is therefore the same sound as /o/ only differing in the length of time over which it is produced.

áakokaawa / ᖳᖾᖿᖷ	'he will rope'
áakookaawa / ᖳᖾᖿᖷ	'she will sponsor a Sundance'

Consonants can also be lengthened with the exception of /ʔ/, /x/, /j/ and /w/.

kiipíppo / ᖽᑯᑲ	'one hundred'
nínna / ᖹᖻ	'my father'
sokáʼpssiwa / ᓴᖿᑯᐧᖷ	'he is good'

=== Pitch accent ===
Blackfoot is a pitch accent language and it is a contrastive feature in the language. Every word will have at least one high pitched vowel or diphthong but may have more than one. Note that high pitch here is used relative to the contiguous syllables. Blackfoot utterances experience a gradual drop in pitch therefore if an utterance contains a set of accented vowels the first will be higher in pitch than the second but the second will be higher in pitch than the syllables directly surrounding it. Pitch is illustrated in the Latin-script orthography with an acute accent.

ápssiwa	'it's an arrow'
apssíwa	'it's a fig'
máátaissikópiiwa	's/he's not resting'

=== Phonological rules ===
Blackfoot is rich with morpho-phonological changes. Below is a limited sample of phonological rules.

==== Semi-vowel loss ====
Glides are deleted after another consonant, except a glottal stop, or word initially but kept in other conditions.

	/w/ loss
poos-wa cat-AN.SG	→	póósa / ᑲᓭ 'cat'
	/j/ loss
óóhkotok-yi stone-INAN.SG	→	óóhkotoki / ᖲᑊᖾᒪᖽ 'stone'
	word-initial
w-ókoʼsi 3.SG.POSS-child	→	ókoʼsi / ᖲᖾᓱ 'his/her child'

==== Accent spread ====
Accent will spread from an accented vowel to the following vowel across morpheme boundaries.

á-okskaʼsiwa	→	áókskaʼsiwa	's/he runs'
atsikí-istsi	→	atsikíístsi	'shoes'

==== Vowel devoicing ====
At the end of a word, non-high pitched vowels are devoiced, regardless of length.

== Grammar ==
=== Lexical categories ===
Lexical categories in Blackfoot are a matter of debate in the literature, with the exception of nouns and verbs. Additional proposed categories, proposed by Uhlenbeck, are adjectives, pronouns, adverbs, and particles. Taylor classifies the Blackfoot language as having two major classes, substantives (nouns and pronouns) and verbs, with one minor class consisting of particles. Frantz classifies adjectives and adverbs as affixes but not independent classes.

==== Agreement ====
Agreement morphology is extensive in Blackfoot and agreement morphemes are often fusional, i.e. animacy and number (nouns) or person and number (verbs) are indicated within the same affix.

==== Animacy ====
All nouns are required to be inflected for animacy and are classified as either animate or inanimate. Verbs are inflected to agree in animacy with their arguments. Animacy in Blackfoot is a grammatical construct for noun classification. Therefore, some semantically inherently inanimate objects, such as drums and knives, are grammatically animate.

Verbs are marked with a transitivity marker which must agree with the animacy of its arguments. Even in stories in which grammatically inanimate objects are markedly anthropomorphized, such as talking flowers, speakers will not use animate agreement markers with them.

==== Number ====
All nouns are required to be inflected as either singular or plural. Verbal inflection matches the number of its arguments.

==== Person marking ====
Blackfoot has five grammatical persons – first, second, third (proximate), fourth (obviative), and fifth (sub-obviative).

=== Word order ===
Word order is flexible in Blackfoot. Subjects are not required to precede the verb. Independent noun phrases may be included but these are typically dropped in Blackfoot. Due to the extensive person inflection on the verb they are not necessary for interpreting the meaning of the utterance. However, if first or second person pronouns are present it yields an emphatic reading. There is an ordering restriction if the Distinct Third Person (DTP) attached pronoun /-aawa/ is used in which the subject independent noun phrase must occur before the verb. If the independent noun phrase occurs after the verb then the DTP may not be used.

=== Subjecthood ===
Blackfoot nouns must be grammatically particular in order to be a subject of a verb. In transitive constructions the subject must be volitional to be interpreted as subject.

=== Person hierarchy ===
It has been asserted that Blackfoot, along with other Algonquian languages, violates the Universal Person Hierarchy in verb complexes by ranking second person over first person. The hierarchy has traditionally been published as 2nd person > 1st person > 3rd person (proximate) > 4th person (obviative). However, alternative analyses of Blackfoot person hierarchy have been published that suggest the Universal Person Hierarchy is applicable to Blackfoot.

=== Verbal structure ===
The Blackfoot verbal template contains a stem with several prefixes and suffixes. The structure of the verb stem in Blackfoot can be roughly broken down into the pre-verb, the root, the medial, and the final. The root and final are required elements.

Generally, information encoded in the pre-verb can include adverbs, most pronouns, locatives, manners, aspect, mood, and tense. Incorporated objects appear in the medial. The final includes transitivity and animacy markers, and valency markers.

=== Nouns ===
==== Agreement morphology ====
Noun classes are split based on grammatical gender into two categories: animate and inanimate. Additionally, all nouns must be marked for number. Number agreement suffixes attach to noun stems and take four forms, as shown in the table below.

Inanimate		Animate	
Singular	Plural	Singular	Plural
-yi	-istsi	-wa	-iksi

íʼksisako / ᖱᖽᐧᓭᖾ (inanimate stem)			'meat'
íʼksisako-yi / ᖱᖽᐧᓭᖾᔪ	→	íʼksisakoyi / ᖱᖽᐧᓭᖾᔪ	'meat'
íʼksisako-istsi / ᖱᖽᐧᓭᖾᐟᐧᒧᐧ	→	íʼksisakoistsi / ᖱᖽᐧᓭᖾᐟᐧᒧᐧ	'meats'

==== Proximate and obviative ====
When a sentence contains two or more particular animate gender nouns as arguments, proximate (major third person/3rd) and obviative (minor third person/4th) markings are used to disambiguate. There may only be one proximate argument in any given sentence but multiple obviates are permissible. Proximate arguments are more prominent in discourse. Redirectional markers, referred to as inverse and direct theme in the literature, can be applied to indicate that the fourth person is the subject argument.

==== Particularity/referentiality ====
Blackfoot nouns must be grammatically particular, according to Frantz (2009), in order to be a subject of a verb. To be the subject of any verb in Blackfoot the noun must point to a specific referent in the world. In transitive constructions the subject must also be volitional to be interpreted as subject. If the subject of a transitive verb is non-specific or non-volitional then the verb must be inflected as having an unspecified subject.

Oma isttoána iihtsíkahksiniiʼpi annistsi ikkstsíksiistsi.
ᖲᒐ ᖱᐧᒪᖷᖻ ᖱᑊᒧᐧᖿᐦᖽᐧᖹᑯ ᖳᖹᐧᒧᐧ ᖱᘁᐧᒧᐧᖽᐧᒧᐧ᙮
om-wa isttoan-wa iiht-íkahksinii-ʼp-yi ann-istsi ikkstsíksi-istsi
that-AN.SG knife-AN.SG means-cut.off-UNSPEC.SUB-INAN.PL that-INAN.PL branch-INAN.PL
'The knife cut off those branches.' or 'By means of the knife, the branches were cut off.'

=== Verbs ===
==== Verbal morphology template ====
There are four verb categories in Blackfoot: intransitive inanimate, intransitive animate, transitive inanimate, and transitive animate. The parameters of transitivity and animacy for verb selection are typically referred to as stem agreement in order to delineate it from person agreement. The animacy for intransitive verbs is determined by the subject of the verb whereas the transitive verbs are defined by the animacy of their primary object.

The only required component of a clause in Blackfoot is the verb, referred to as a verbal complex in the Algonquian literature, which must be appropriately inflected according to the standard template:

preverb – root – medial – final

Preverbs are prefixes which encode adverbs, most pronouns, locatives, manners, aspect, mood, and tense. Medials are suffixes which primarily encode manner and incorporated objects. Finals are suffixes which encode transitivity, animacy, and valency. Roots and finals are always required in a verbal complex whereas preverb and medials are not.

==== Inverse and direct theme ====
When there are two animate arguments acting in a transitive animate verb stem one of the arguments must be acting on the other. Which argument is the actor (subject) and which is the acted upon (object) is indicated by the use of direct or inverse theme marking. If a subject argument is higher than the object argument on the person hierarchy then the direct suffix is used. Conversely, when an object outranks the sentences subject then the inverse suffix is used.

Direct

Nitsikákomimmayi nitániksi.
ᖹᒧᐧᖿᖾᒍᒉᔪ ᖹᒣᖹᖽᐧ᙮
nit-ikákomimm-aa-yi ni-táni-iksi
1.SG-love-DIR-3.PL 1.POSS-daughter-AN.PL
'I love my daughters.'

Inverse

Nitsikákomimmoki nitániksi.
ᖹᒧᐧᖿᖾᒍᒐᖽ ᖹᒣᖹᖽᐧ᙮
nit-ikákomimm-ok-yi ni-táni-iksi
1.SG-love-INV-3.PL 1.POSS-daughter-AN.PL
'My daughters love me.'

==== Voice and valency ====
Blackfoot voice alterations occur as suffixes on the verb and fall into the category of finals. Finals can include causative, benefactive, reciprocal, and reflexive affixes that either decrease or increase the valency of the stem they are attached to. Below is an example of the reflexive final suffix. It can only be added to a transitive animate stem and results in an animate intransitive stem. This is then interpreted as being a reflexive verb, where the subject of the AI (animate intransitive) stem is understood to be both the underlying subject and object of the original verb stem.

Oma imitááwa siiksípohsiwa.
ᖲᒐ ᖱᒍᒣᖷ ᓱᖽᐧᑲᐦᓱᖷ᙮
om-wa imitáá-wa siiksip-o꞉hsi-wa
that-AN.SG dog-AN.SG PST:bite(TA)-REFL(AI)-3.SG
'That dog bit itself.'

==== Relative clauses ====
Relative clauses are rare in Blackfoot but they do occur. In order to embed a clause, it needs to be nominalized first. The reclassification strategy for nominalization is displayed here followed by a relative clause that uses a nominal formed by this strategy. Reclassification is done by adding nominal inflection to the verb stem instead of person inflection. This derived form then refers to the underlying subject and agrees in both number and animacy.

Omiksi áyoʼkaiksi
ᖲᒍᖽᐧ ᖳᔭᖼᖽᐧ᙮
om-iksi á-yoʼkaa-iksi
that-AN.PL DUR-sleep-AN.PL
'those sleeping ones'

Examples below show how a reclassified nominalized clause is used in a relative clause. Note the nominal agreement morphology on the verb matches the subject, singular and plural, respectively.

Oma nínaawa áyoʼkaawa nóoma.
ᖲᒐ ᖹᖻᖷ ᖳᔭᖿᖷ ᖺᒉ᙮
om-wa ninaa-wa á-yoʼkaa-wa n-oom-wa
that-AN.SG man-AN.SG DUR-sleep-AN.SG 1.POSS-husband-AN.SG
'That man who is sleeping is my husband.'

Omiksi aakííkoaiksi áínihkiiksi áyaakahkayiyaawa.
ᖲᒍᖽᐧ ᖳᖽᖿᙿᐟᖽᐧ ᖰᖹᑊᖽᖽᐧ ᖳᔦᖿᐦᖿᔪᔦᖷ᙮
om-iksi aakííkoaN-iksi á-Inihki-iksi áyaak-wa:hkayi-yi-aawa
that-AN.PL girl-AN.PL DUR-sing-AN.PL FUT-go.home-3.PL-PRO
'Those girls who are singing are on their way home.'

== Orthography ==
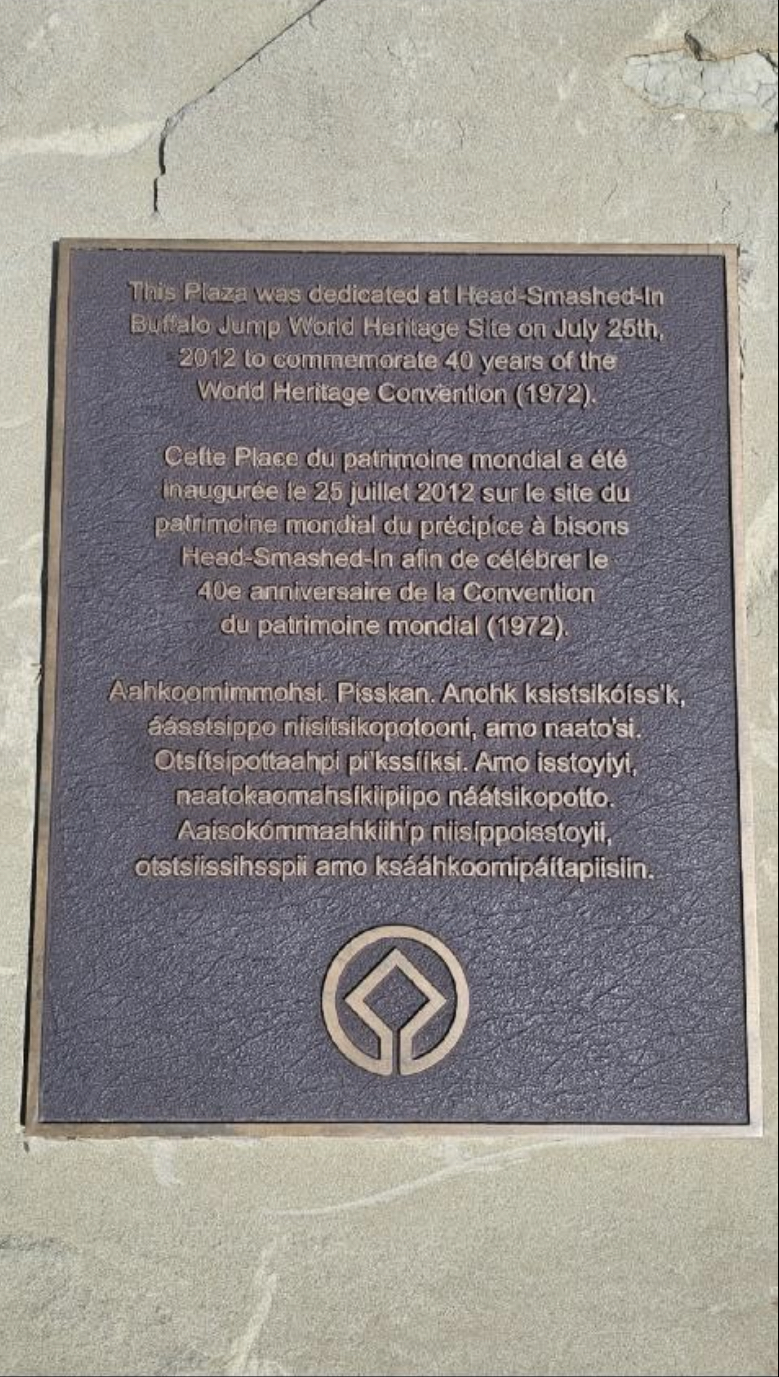
Trilingual texts of English, French, and Blackfoot at Head-Smashed-In Buffalo Jump

=== Latin-script orthography ===
The Siksiká, Káínai, and Aapátohsipikani (Piikáni) reserves adopted a standardized Latin-script orthography in 1975. The Blackfoot alphabet consists of 13 letters: ⟨a, h, i, k, m, n, o, p, s, t, w, y⟩, and a glottal stop ⟨ʼ⟩.

Letter	A a	H h	I i	K k	M m	N n	O o	P p	S s	T t	W w	Y y	ʼ
IPA	[a] ~ [ʌ]	[h] ~ [x] ~ [ç]	[i] ~ [ɪ]	[k]	[m]	[n]	[o] ~ [ʊ] ~ [u]	[p]	[s]	[t]	[w]	[j]	[ʔ]

Two digraphs are also used: ts [ts] and ks [ks].

Diphthongs	IPA
ai	[ej] ~ [ɛ] ~ [æ] ~ [aj]
ao	[ɔ] ~ [aw]
oi	[oj]

Vowels can be marked with an acute accent or underlined to illustrate pitch accent. Vowels and consonants that are long are written with a double letter (aa = [aː]).

=== Other Latin-script orthographies ===
There are other Latin-script orthographies that some Blackfoot speakers use.

==== Big Bull Writing System ====
Some schools in Aamsskáápipikani / ǎmssk̇ǎaṗiiṗiik̇ǔni (Blackfeet Nation) adopted a Latin-script orthography with diacritics. This Latin-script orthography is called the Big Bull Writing System (niitsiiꞏṗoʹꞏʺsin), created by William Big Bull, a Piikani teacher who works for Blackfeet Community College. He taught the language and piloted online classes. He is the President of āasāisstꞏṫǒ Language Society, a non-profit organization that revives the Blackfoot language. The writing system was developed around the 20th century. Its purpose is to revitalize Blackfoot and promote literacy, and it is used for teaching, writing books, flims, etc. The Big Bull Writing System consists of 35 letters with 3 diacritics͏ ⟨◌̌, ◌̄, ◌̇⟩.

Big Bull Writing System
Letter	ǎ	ǎa	āa/ā	āi	ai/ay	i	ii	īī	ǐǐ	īy	iw	ō/o	oō	ǒ	oǒ	ǔ	p	ṗ	k	k̇	m	n	t	ṫ	h	ks	ps	ts	s	ss	ʹ	ʺ	w	y	ꞏ
IPA	[a]	[a͏ː]	[æ]	[ɛ]	[ej]	[ɪ]	[i]	[iː]	[e]	[aj]	[iw]	[o] ~ [ɔ]	[oː] ~ [u] (Note: oō is pronounced [oː], but sometimes it pronounced as [u] or [uː] in some words.)	[ʊ]	[ʊw]	[ʌ]	[pʰ]	[p]	[kʰ]	[k]	[m]	[n]	[tʰ]	[t]	[h]	[ks]	[ps]	[ts]	[s]	[sː]	[ç] (Note: ʹ is pronounced /ç/, it occurs after i, but sometimes is a accent shift)	[x]	[w]	[y]	[ʔ]

This writing system is used in some schools in Aamsskáápipikani / ǎmssk̇ǎaṗiiṗiik̇ǔni, mainly used in Blackfeet Community College, and also used in various other places in the United States and Canada.

==== Holterman Writing System ====
The Holterman Writing System was developed by Linguist Jack Holterman and is used by the Piegan Institute to write and teach in Blackfoot. This writing system is similar to Donald Frantz's Orthography, though uses ⟨z⟩ for /ts/ and ⟨x⟩ for /ks/. It also leave out long vowels and glottal stops. The Holterman Writing System consists of 15 letters.

Holterman Writing System
Letter	A a	H h	I i	K k	M m	N n	O o	P p	S s	T t	U u	W w	X x	Y y	Z z
IPA	[a], [aː]	[h]~[x]~[ç]	[i]~[ɪ], [iː]	[k]	[m]	[n]	[o]~[ʊ]~[u], [oː]~[uː]	[p]	[s]	[t]	[ʌ]	[w]	[ks]	[j]	[ts]

This writing system is used in Nizi Puh Wah Sin (Cuts School) and some places in Aamsskáápipikani (Blackfeet Nation).

==== Weatherwax Writing System ====
The Weatherwax Writing System was developed by Elder Wayne Weatherwax and is used by some schools and places in Aamsskáápipikani (Blackfeet Nation). This writing system is used for phonetic purposes. The Weatherwax Writing System consists of 12 letters.

Weatherwax Writing System
Letter	A	H	I	K	M	N	O	P	S	T	W	Y
IPA	[a] ~ [ʌ]	[h] ~ [x] ~ [ç]	[i] ~ [ɪ]	[k]	[m]	[n]	[o] ~ [ʊ] ~ [u]	[p]	[s]	[t]	[w]	[j]

=== Syllabic writing systems ===
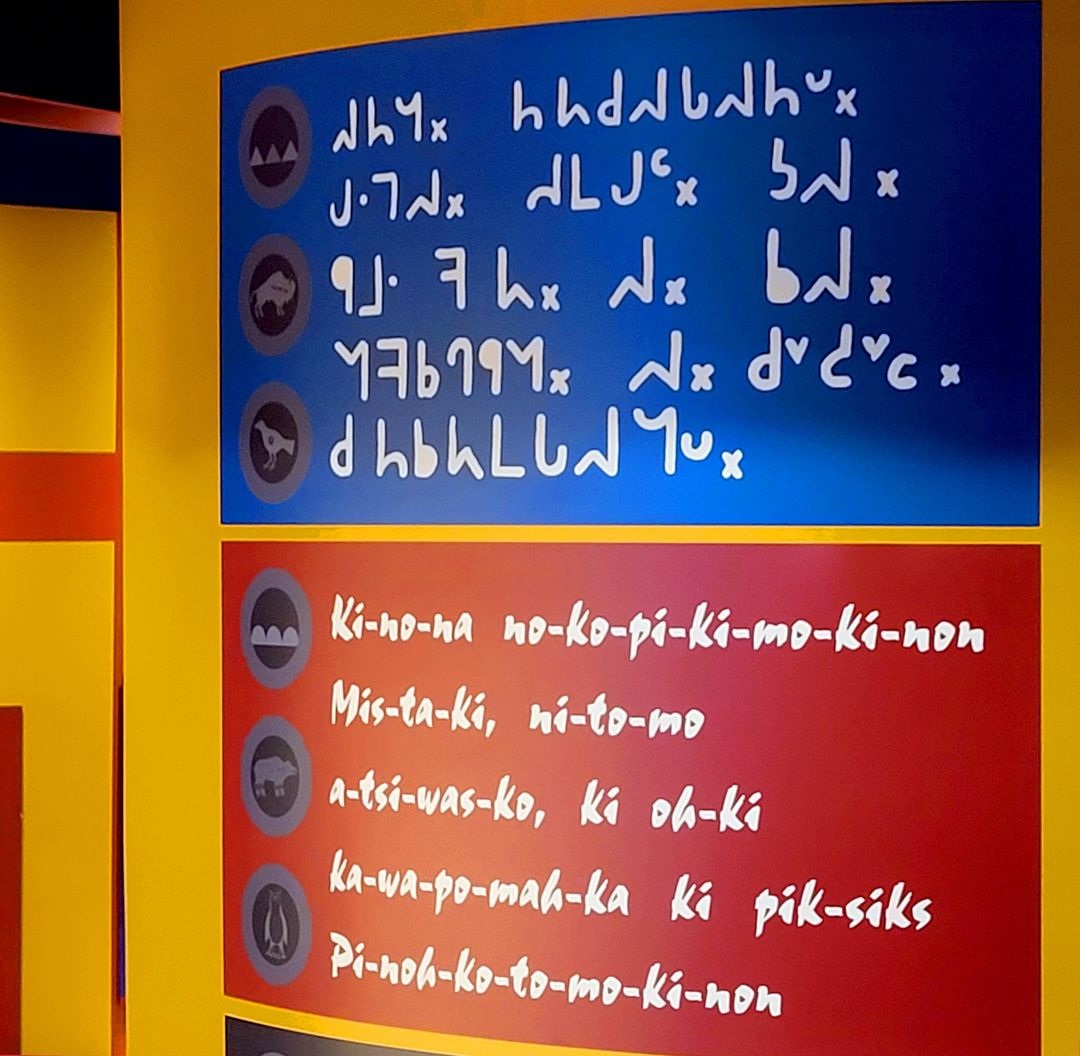
A Blackfoot language text with both missionary J.W. Tims's Syllabary and the Latin orthography

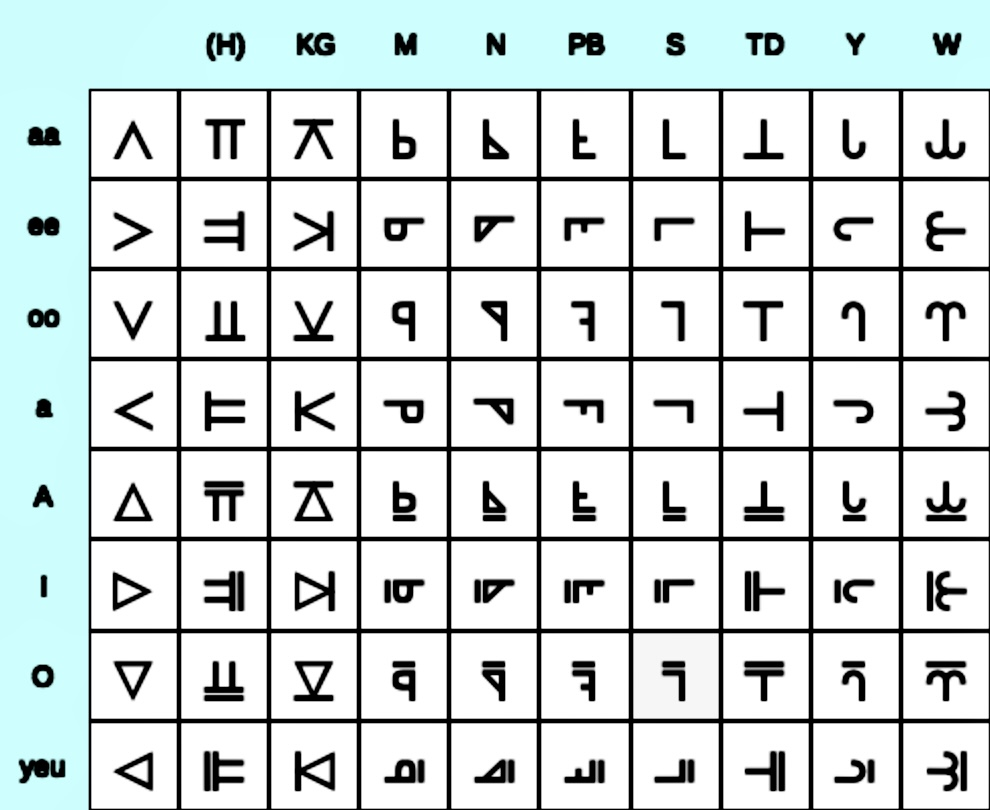
Table of T.F. Heavyrunner's Blackfoot syllabics (standard)

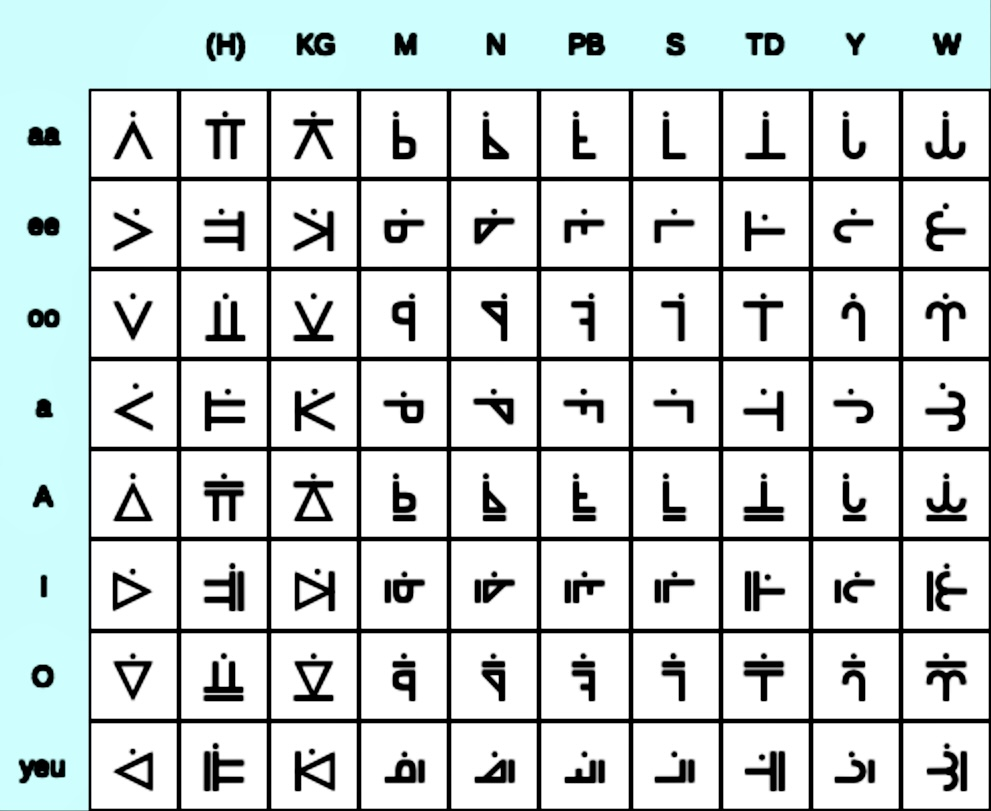
Table of T.F. Heavyrunner's Blackfoot syllabics (stops)

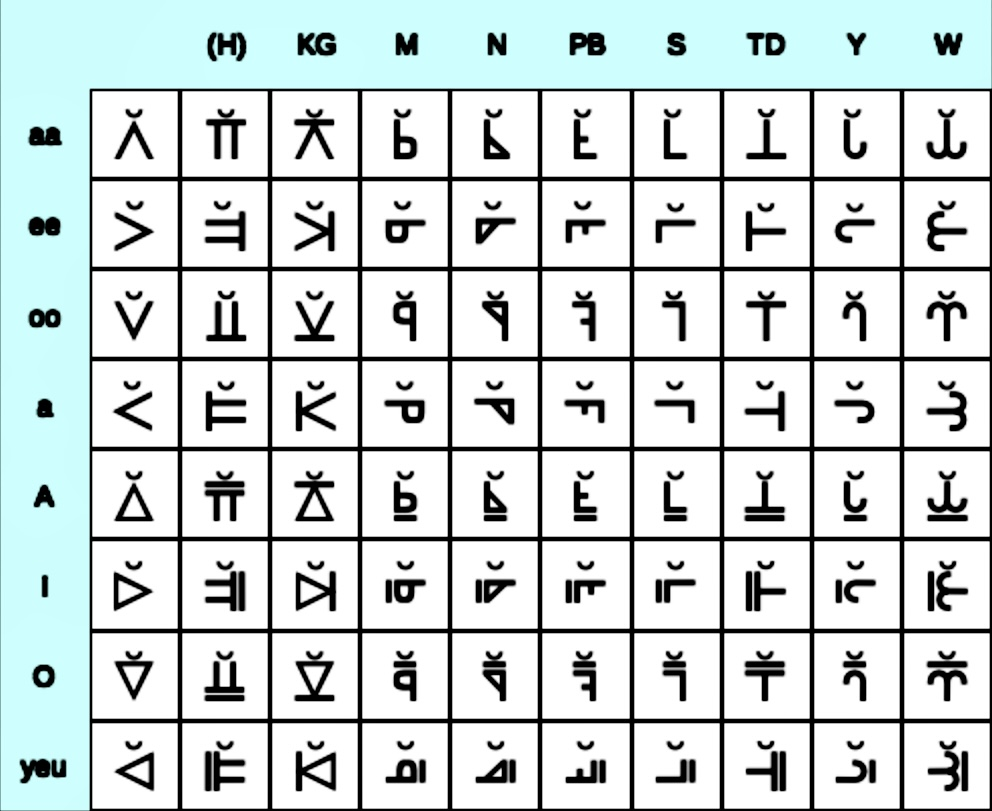
Table of T.F. Heavyrunner's Blackfoot syllabics (extension)

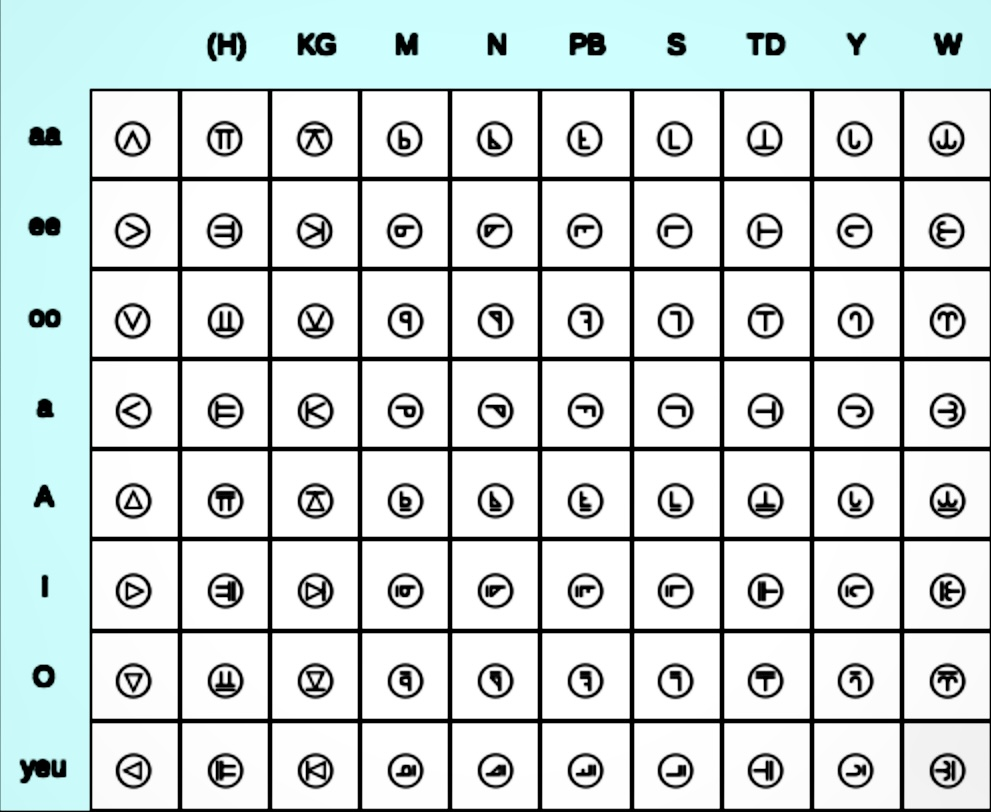
Table of T.F. Heavyrunner's Blackfoot syllabics (infection)

==== Blackfoot Syllabary ====
A syllabics script, ᑯᖾᖹ ᖿᐟᖻ ᓱᖽᐧᖿ pikoni kayna siksika or ᓱᖽᐧᖿ siksika, was created by Anglican missionary John William Tims around 1888, for his Bible translation work. Although conceptually nearly identical to Western Cree syllabics, the letter forms are innovative. Two series (s, y) were taken from Cree but given different vowel values; three more (p, t, m) were changed in consonant values as well, according to the Latin letter they resembled; and the others (k, n, w) were created from asymmetrical parts of Latin and Greek letters; or in the case of the zero consonant, possibly from the musical notation for quarter note. The Latin orientation of the letters is used for the e series, after the names of the Latin letters, pe, te, etc.

Blackfoot	Latin source
ᑭ pe	P
ᒥ te	T
ᖼ ke	K
ᒋ me	m
ᖸ ne	N
ᖴ we	digamma Ϝ

The direction for each vowel is different from Cree, reflecting Latin alphabetic order. The e orientation is used for the diphthong /ai/. Symbols for syllable final/medial consonants are taken from the -a series consonant symbol minus the stem, also forming diphthongs (Ca plus -w ⟨ᐠ⟩ for Cao, and Co plus -y ⟨ᐟ⟩ for Coi though there are also cases of writing subphonemic [ai, ei, eu] with these finals), while the medials form the affricates /ks/, /ts/ like ⟨ᖿᐧ⟩ ksa, ⟨ᒣᐧ⟩ tsa and clusters like ⟨ᖿᑉ⟩ kya, ⟨ᖿᙿ⟩ kwa.

C	-a	-e	-i	-o	final	medial
(none)	ᖳ	ᖰ	ᖱ	ᖲ		
p-	ᑫ	ᑭ	ᑯ	ᑲ	ᐤ	
t-	ᒣ	ᒥ	ᒧ	ᒪ	ᐨ	
k-	ᖿ	ᖼ	ᖽ	ᖾ	ᘁ	
m-	ᒉ	ᒋ	ᒍ	ᒐ	ᐢ	
n-	ᖻ	ᖸ	ᖹ	ᖺ	ᐡ	
s-	ᓭ	ᓯ	ᓱ	ᓴ	ᔈ	ᐧ
y-	ᔦ	ᔨ	ᔪ	ᔭ	ᐟ	ᑉ
w-	ᖷ	ᖴ	ᖵ	ᖶ	ᐠ	ᙿ

There are additional finals: allophones ⟨ᑊ⟩ [h] and ⟨ᐦ⟩ [x].

⟨᙮⟩ is used for a period.

A modified version of the Latin script may also be used for fonts or computers that do not have the sufficient letters used in the standard orthography.

==== Blackfoot syllabics ====
The Blackfoot syllabics is a syllabic script, developed by Thomas Floyd Heavyrunner, who introduced the syllabics to Sheldon First Rider around the 20th century. Its purpose is for reviving Blackfoot. The syllabics were inspired by the Cherokee syllabary. They received assistance from Red Iron Labs to develop a keyboard and an app called "oo(kg)ee". The Blackfoot syllabics consists of four charts of 80 characters with plain characters and markings.

=== Literature ===
John Tims was an Anglican clergyman with the Church Missionary Society. He was at Blackfoot reserve from 1883 to 1895. Tims translated parts of the Bible into Blackfoot. Selections from the Gospel of Matthew were published by the Church Missionary Society Mission Press in 1887. The Gospel of Matthew was published by the British and Foreign Bible Society in 1890, and other portions of Scripture were published as Readings from the Holy Scriptures by the Society for Promoting Christian Knowledge in 1890. He used both Roman script and a Canadian Aboriginal syllabics script. The Gospel of Mark was translated by Donald G. Frantz and Patricia Frantz, and published by Scriptures Unlimited, a joint venture of the New York Bible Society (later called Biblica) and the World Home Bible League (later called the Bible League) in 1972. The Gospel of John was translated by Wycliffe Bible Translators and Blackfoot people and published by the Canadian Bible Society in 1979.

== Causes of endangerment ==
Negative attitude towards Blackfoot is the primary reason for endangerment. Most children were discouraged from speaking the minority language in schools or public places. Children were often beaten for speaking their native language and were sent home. Teachers were very ashamed when their students spoke their native language.

== Vitality ==
According to the UNESCO Factor 1: Intergenerational Transmission, Blackfoot is classified under severely endangered. It is predicted that Blackfoot is used mostly by the grandparental generation and up. In fact, there are no more than 1500 native speakers, most of whom are likely over the age of 50. Due to the lack of speakers, the language will likely be extinct within the next 40 years. Once older people pass away, no one will be speaking Blackfoot unless something changes.

According to the UNESCO Factor 9: Amount and Quality of Documentation, there may be adequate grammar or sufficient amount of grammar, dictionaries, and texts. For example, a secondary documentation exists today, Blackfoot Dictionary of Stems, Roots and Affixes, 3rd Edition (2017), written by Donald G. Frantz and Norma Jean Russell. The newest edition includes more than 1,000 new entries, major additions to verb stems, contains more than 5,500 Blackfoot–English entries, and an English index of more than 6,000 entries. The transcription uses an official, technically accurate alphabet and the authors of this book have classified entries and selected examples based on more than 46 years of research. This book is comprehensive and includes enough information for those who wish to learn Blackfoot and for those who have an interest in Native Studies and North American linguistics.

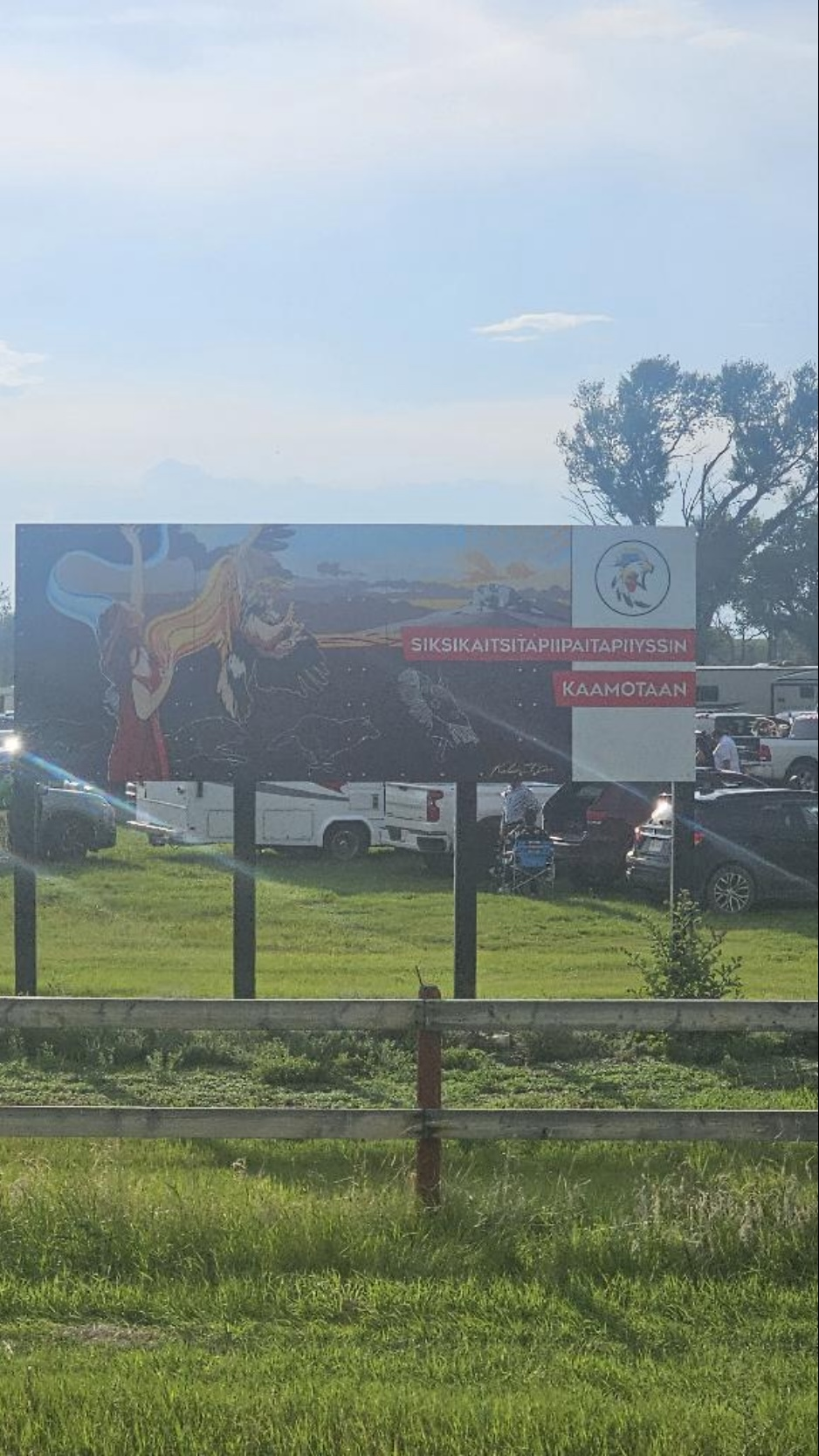
Blackfoot Language Sign at Red Crow Park, in Kainai Nation, reads "Siksikaitsitapiipaitapiiyssin, Kaamotaan" meaning: The Blackfoot way of life, is for survival.

== Revitalization efforts ==
In the late 1900s, many tribes began a surge of revitalization efforts to encourage cultural awareness of indigenous customs and traditions. Of these, the Blackfoot revitalization effort has proven to be quite successful, producing various institutions, including a college dedicated to preserving and promoting Blackfoot traditions. Today, there are head-start programs in primary and secondary schools on the reservation to teach even infants and toddlers about the history of the tribe from an early age.

=== Piegan Institute ===
In 1987, Dorothy Still Smoking and Darrell Robes Kipp founded the Piegan Institute, a private 501(c)(3) non-profit foundation in Montana dedicated to researching, promoting, and preserving the Native American Languages, particularly the Blackfoot language. Piegan Institute founded Nizipuhwahsin (also Nizi Puh Wah Sin or Niitsípuwahsin or Cuts Wood) School in 1995 as a Blackfoot language K–8 immersion school. Since its inception the school has grown and relocated to the center of Browning, Montana, in a custom-built schoolhouse. Recently, some of the school's first graduates have returned to teach the newest generation the Blackfoot language.

=== Blackfeet Community College ===
Blackfeet Community College (BCC), founded in 1974, is a two-year, nationally accredited college that was made possible by the Indian Education Act of 1972 and the 1964 Act enacted by the Office of Economic Opportunity. BCC is a member of both the American Indian Higher Education Consortium and the American Indian Science and Engineering Society (AISES). It allows teenagers and adults alike to take classes in a wide range of subjects, from classes in Psychology and Digital Photography to classes on Blackfoot language and tradition. They have beginning Blackfoot language classes with labs for members and non-members of the community to learn the language.

=== Chief Mountain Technologies ===
In order to create jobs for the Blackfoot people with real-world applications, the Blackfeet Tribal Business Council launched a company called Chief Mountain Technologies in 2009. This company gives tribal members the opportunity to work in the fields of computer science and business in Browning, Montana, on behalf of various government organizations. The establishment of this company in the Blackfoot community allows the people to use their culture and their language in the modern world while maintaining their traditions.

=== Radio programming in Blackfoot ===
Radio station KBWG in Browning, Montana, broadcasts a one-hour show for Blackfoot language learners four times a week. The Voice of Browning, Thunder Radio, FM 107.5, or Ksistsikam ayikinaan (literally 'voice from nowhere') went live in 2010, and focuses on positive programming. In 2011, John Davis, a 21-year-old Blackfeet Community College student explained, "I was the first Blackfeet to ever talk on this radio", Davis said. "This is my coup story." A story in the Great Falls Tribune noted, "When the station was replaying programming that originated elsewhere, the radio was all 'tear in my beer' and 'your cheatin' heart.' They called it the suicide station for its depressing old country themes ..." The station's offerings have now expanded beyond country to include AC/DC and Marvin Gaye, and "on-the-air jokes they would never hear on a Clear Channel radio station, such as: 'The captain is as cool as commodity cheese.'"

"So far we have broadcasting Monday through Friday from around 6:30, Indian time", quipped station manager Lona Burns, "to around 11, Indian time." ... "Its Indian radio", agreed Running Crane. "Where else can you hear today's hits with traditional music?"

=== Canadian government support ===
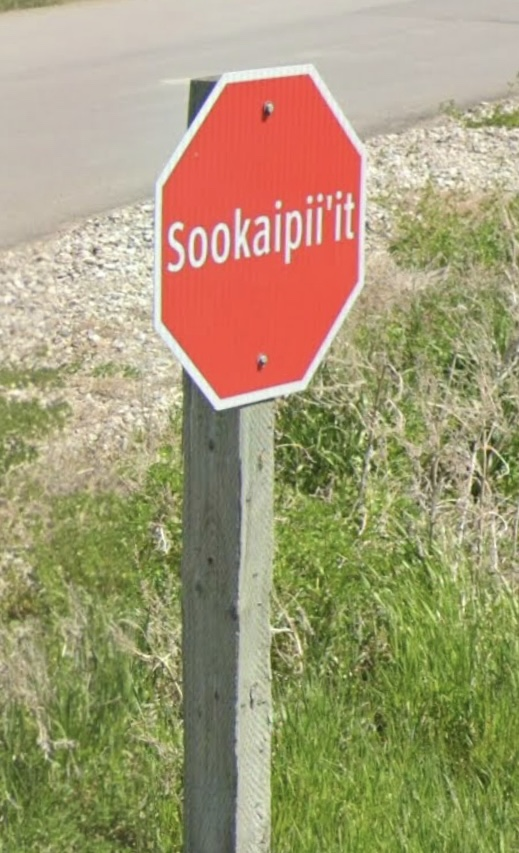
A Blackfoot language Stop Sign at Siksiká Reserve

The Canadian government has provided support for the languages through funds and other financial resources. According to James Moore, the former Minister of Canadian Heritage and Official Languages, "the Government of Canada is committed to the revitalization and preservation of Aboriginal languages." The funding was put to use in the form of digital libraries containing interviews with native speakers, online courses, and various other resources in the hopes of promoting Blackfoot language and passing it down to subsequent generations. On top of both of these government efforts, the Canadian Government has also provided over $40,000 through the Aboriginal Languages Initiative Fund to promote the use of Aboriginal languages in community and family settings.

In 2019 the Canadian government announced their investment of over $1.5 million towards supporting Indigenous languages in Southern Alberta. Eleven out of seventeen projects approved for funding focus on revitalization of the Blackfoot language and include efforts such as language classes, illustrated workbooks, graphic novels, a video game, and a mobile app.

In addition to federal funding, the Blackfoot language is also supported through Alberta's Indigenous Languages in Education grant program. This program offers up to $285,000 annually towards the development of Indigenous language training, programs, and curricula for instructors between Kindergarten and Grade 12, and an additional $50,000 annually towards development of new resources for Indigenous language teaching and learning.

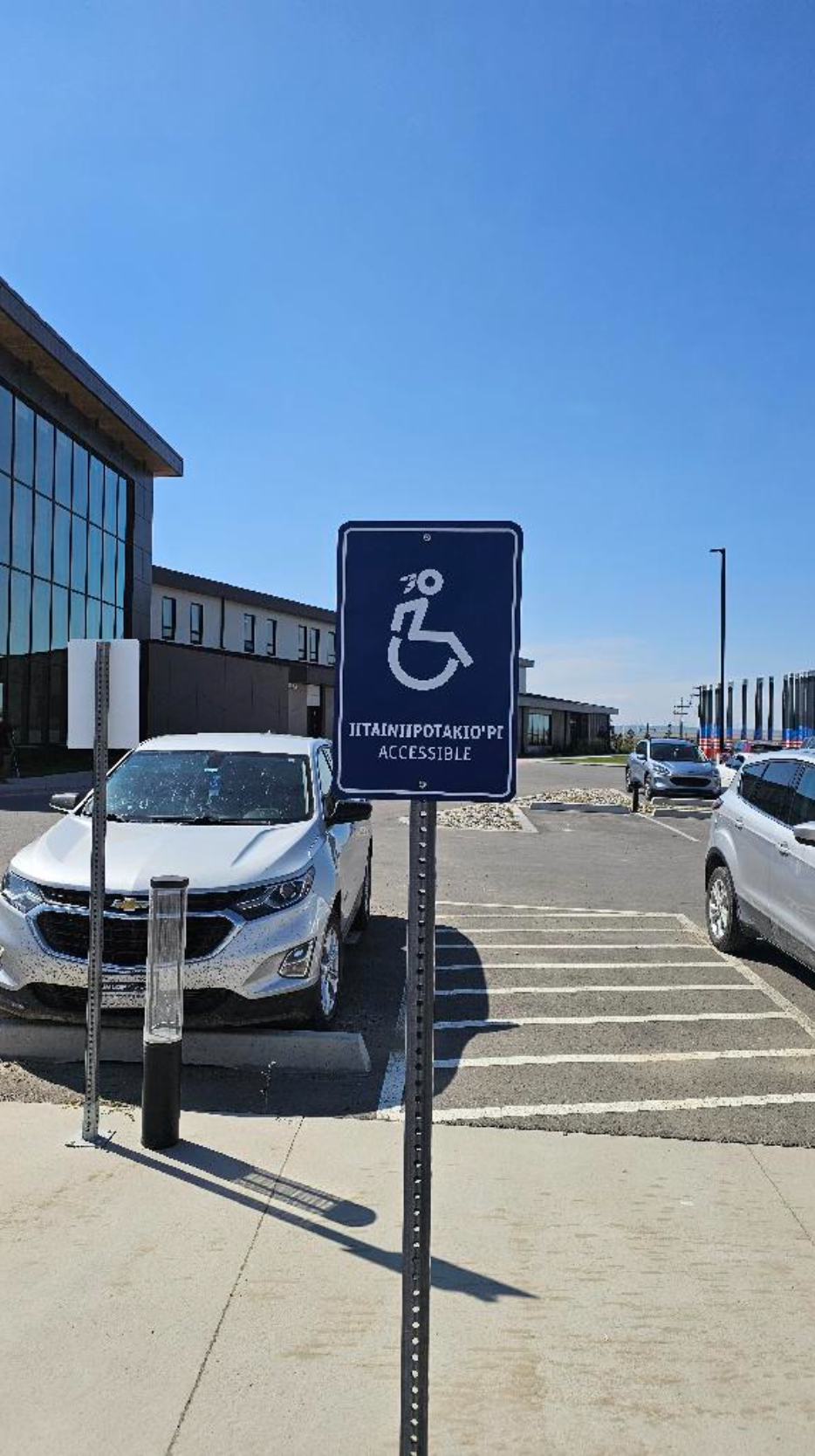
A handicap parking sign in Blackfoot, at Red Crow Community College

=== Piikani Traditional Knowledge Services ===
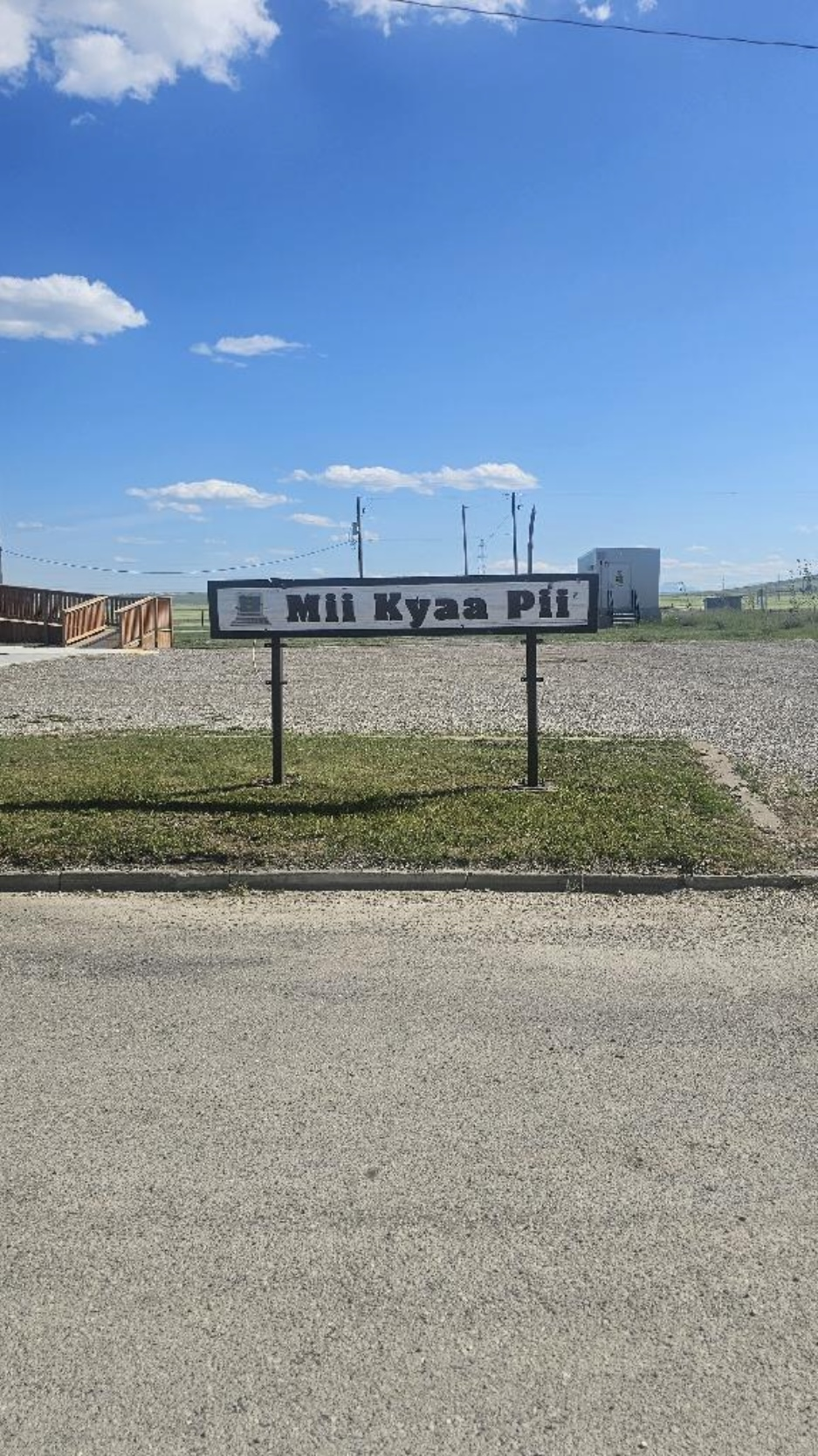
MiiKyaaPii Language House Centre, a centre located by Peigan Board of Education, Brocket, Alberta, Canada

Piikani Traditional Knowledge Services serve the Piikani Nation as the first stop in understanding the development of meaningful relationships with the Indigenous Nation. Their vision is to enhance, preserve, protect, and be keepers of the Piikani culture, language, spirituality, songs, customs, and history. This program is committed to sustaining and preserving Piikanisinni, the way of life of the Piikani, that identifies characteristic values, principles, and integrity maintained from ancient Piikani culture and practices. The program includes Piikanissi cultural education and training, Piikanissini cultural mobilization, Piikanissini data management, and provides resources that promote Piikanissini. This program is community-based and focuses on keeping the Blackfoot culture and language alive.

== Vocabulary ==
Some Blackfoot Vocabulary is presented below.

=== Word lists ===
Numbers
Blackfoot	English
Niʼtókskaa	One
Náátoʼka	Two
Nioókska	Three
Niisó(yi)	Four
Nisitó(yi)	Five
Náao(yi)	Six
Ihkitsíkaa	Seven
Náániso(yi)	Eight
Piihkssó(yi)	Nine
Kiipó(yi)	Ten
Niʼtsikópotto	Eleven
Náátsikopotto	Twelve
Niiíkopotto	Thirteen
Niisóíkopotto	Fourteen
Niisitsíkopotto	Fifteen
Náaikopotto	Sixteen
Ihkitsikikopotto	Seventeen
Náánisikopotto	Eighteen
Piihkssikopotto	Nineteen
Náátsippo	Twenty
Niiyíppo	Thirty
Niisíppo	Forty
Niisitsippo	Fifty
Náaippo	Sixty
Ihkitsikippo	Seventy
Náánisippo	Eighty
Piihkssippo	Ninety
Kiipíppo	One hundred
Omahksíkiipippo	One thousand
iksíkkáaaʼsi	One million
omahkssaikimaiksikkáaaʼsi	One trillion

Animals
Blackfoot	English
Píítaa	Eagle
Ksikkihkíni	Bald Eagle
Otaikimmio’tokaan	Golden Eagle
Kiááyo	Bear
Iiníí	Buffalo (Bison)
Áwákaasii	Deer
Issikotoyi / Síkohtoyi / Áísikotoyi	Mule Deer
Áwatoyi / Paahkoomokonaisikaayayi	White tail deer
Saokiawakaasi	Pronghorn
Makóyi	Wolf
Matsiyíkkapisaa	Frog
Ponoká	Elk
Ponokáómitaa	Horse
Ókoʼsiipokaa	Colt
Ááattsistaa	Rabbit
Sspopíi	Turle
Míísinsski	Badger
Piʼkssíí	Bird
Póós	Cat
Áápotskina	Cow
Aiksippoyinnomoa	Milk cow
Onistaahs	Calf
Áísaayoohkomi	Bull
Imitáá	Dog
Mamíí	Fish
Sinopáá	Fox
Omahkokata	Gopher
Áíksini	Pig
Kaiskááhpa / Kaaysskááhp	Porcupine
Íímahkihkinaa	Sheep
Piksííksiinaa / Pitsííksiinaa	Snake
Aapíʼsi	Coyote
Naanaisskiinaa	Mouse
Áápiikayi	Skunk
Kitsisomahkokata	Raccoon
Otáá / Áápaa	Weasel
Natáyo / Natááyo	Lynx
Omahkatayo	Cougar
Áápomahkihkinaa	Mountain goat
Sikihtsisoo	Moose
Áímmóniisi	Otter
Ksísskstaki	Beaver
Soyiiʼkayi	Mink
Míʼsohpsski	Muskrat
Komoyokstsiikinakim	Worm
Soyʼsksíssi	Fly
Áísskoʼkíínaa	Ant
Ksisówáwakaasi / Ksiwáwákaasi	Spider
Naamóó	Bee
Apánii	Butterfly
Ksisohksísi	Mosquito
Tsikatsíí	Grasshopper
Naamsskíí	Lizard
Maiʼstóó	Crow
Omahkáí'stoo	Raven
Sipistto	Owl
Omahksiipiiʼkssíí	Turkey
Kakkoo	Pigeon
Saʼáí	Duck
Áápsspini	Goose
Ksikkómahkayii / Imííhkayii	Swan
Matsííyiiʼsaiʼpiyi	Loon
Mamiáʼtsíkimi	Magpie
Otahkoikayis	Yellow Flicker
Soohksiisiimsstaan	Meadow Lark
Ótsskoisisttsi	Blue Bird (Blue Jay)
Paahpaakssksisii	Woodpecker
Áótahkááokayis	Robin
Áyinnimaa	Hawk
Aapiipíssoohtsi	Marsh Hawk
Omahksisttsiipanikimm	Hawk (Cooper's Hawk)
Iihpohsóaʼtsii	American rough-legged hawk
Íípakssóaʼtsimioʼp	Rough-legged hawk
Ótahkohsóaʼtsis	Redtail hawk
Písspsksi	Sparrow hawk (American Kestral Falcon)
Síkohpoyitaipanikimm	Swainson's hawk
Áóksspiakii / Maká’pipiitaa	Bat
Niʼtawáakii	Chicken
Ómahkiʼtawáakii	Rooster
Kíítokii	Prairie Chicken

Body parts
Blackfoot	English
Moistóm	Body
Ohkin	Bone
Yaamsstsinniman	Braid
Moʼp / Oʼp	Brain
Mónnikis	Breast
Máókayis	Chest
Mohtóókis / Ohtookis	Ear
Mohkínsstsis	Elbow
Moápssp	Eye
Mosstoksís / Mosstiksís	Face
Mookítsis	Finger / Toe
Moʼtsís	Hand / Arm
Moʼtokáán	Head / Hair
Mohkát(i)	Leg / Foot
Maoó	Mouth
Awóʼtaanookitsis	nail of the toe or finger
Mohksisís	Nose
Mohpííkin	Tooth
Matsiní	Tongue

Clothing
Blackfoot	English
Istotoohsin	Clothes
Istotóóhsinniaawa	Clothing
Kiááyo immoyáán / Kiááyootokis	Bear robe
Óʼkinisókaʼsim	Blouse
Áwákaasiisókaʼsim	Buckskin dress
Áwákaasiistotoohsin	Buckskin outfit
Iiníí immoyáán	Buffalo robe
Isspakóótohtonaitsikin	High-topped moccasin
Aakáísatstaais / Aakáísatstaa	Hudson Bay Coat/blanket
Isttsikánokoisokaʼsim / Isttsikapokoisokaʼsim	Leather jacket
Naaipisstsiitsikin	Sport shoe, sneaker
Niitsítsikin	Moccasin
Maaan	Shawl
Isttohksísokaʼsim	Shirt
Asókaʼsim	Jacket, Dress
Ótsskoitsis / Áttsii	Overall pants
Atsikín	Shoe
Atóʼahsim	Sock
Isttsómoʼkaan	Hat
Aamsskáápaipisstsioksim	Pendleton Coat
Iihtáísoksistawaʼsaoʼp	Vest

Colours
Blackfoot	English
Siksinááttsi(wa)	Black
Apoyíínaattsi(wa) / Sikoyahkoinááttsi(wa)	Brown
Áótahkoinááttsi(wa)	Orange
I’kiinááttsi(wa)	Pink
Sáíssksiimokoinaattsi(wa)	Green
Máóhksinááttsi(wa)	Red
Ksikksinááttsi(wa)	White
Ótsskoinaattsi(wa)	Blue
Ikkitsinááttsi(wa)	Grey
Ótahkoinááttsi(wa)	Yellow
Sikotssoinááttsi(wa)	Purple

Commands
Blackfoot	English
Píít!	Come in! (Singular)
Píík!	Come in! (Plural)
Sáksit!	Go outside! (Singular)
Sáksik	Go outside! (Plural)
Pohsápot!	Come here! (Singular)
Pohsápok!	Come here! (Plural)
Misstápot!	Go away! (Singular)
Misstápok!	Go away! (Plural)
Mákopiit!	Sit down! (Singular)
Mákopiik!	Sit down! (Plural)
Popóyiit!	Stand up! (Singular)
Popóyiik!	Stand up! (Plural)
Káyinnit kitsím!	Open the door!
O'kíít kitsím!	Close the door!
Ooyít!	Eat! (Singular)
Ooyík!	Eat! (Plural)
Simít!	Drink! (Singular)
Simík!	Drink! (Plural)
Ko’kíít!	Give it to me!
Kótsis!	Give to him!/her!
Óóhkimaat!	Wait! (Singular)
Óóhkimaak!	Wait! (Plural)
Sokáí’piiyit!	Stop!
Pokákit!	Wake up! (Singular)
Pokákik!	Wake up! (Plural)
Powáót!	Get up! (Singular)
Powáók	Get up! (Plural)
Issiskíítsit!	Wash your face!
Istsimííyit!	Wash your hands!
Issiikííniistsit	Brush your teeth!
Ákksskiinííyit	Comb your hair!
Mátoyokaat!	Go to sleep!
Saotááwahkaat!	Go outside and play!
Isspómmokit!	Help me!
Isspómmos!	Help him!/her!
Issákit!	Wash the dishes!
Ksikkápistotákit!	Clean up!
Kitsitáyokahpa!	Clean up your bedroom!
Aksistótohsit!	Put your clothes on!
Máá’ksaapsskaohsit!	Put your coat on!
Iksskóópiit!	Sit still! (Singular)
Iksskóópiik!	Sit still! (Plural)
Isstsánopiit!	Sit and listen! (Singular)
Isstsánopiik!	Sit and listen! (Plural)
Mátoyakopiit!	Go and sit down! (Singular)
Mátoyakopiik!	Go and sit down! (Plural)
Ámm istópiit!	Sit here! (Singular)
Ámm istópiik!	Sit here! (Plural)
Omm istópiit!	Sit there! (Singular)
Omm istópiik!	Sit there! (Plural)
Issámokit!	Look at me! (Singular)
Issámokik!	Look at me! (Plural)
Isstsííyit!	Listen! (Singular)
Isstsííyik!	Listen! (Plural)
Nitákit!	Hurry! (Singular)
Nitákik!	Hurry! (Plural)
Oo’kíí! / Okí!	Let's go!
Anákimaat!	Turn on the lights!
Misstápohtoot!	Put it away!
Misstápapiksit!	Throw it away!
Kakó!	Go ahead!
Iiyiká’kimaat	Try hard! (Singular)
Iiyiká’kimaak	Try hard! (Plural)
Mááksipoyit!	Line up!
Máksstsitsikit!	Put your shoes on!
Mákssapsskaohsit!	Put your jacket on!

== Sample text ==
Lord's Prayer
English	Blackfoot
Our Father, who art in heaven, hallowed be thy name; thy kingdom come; thy will be done; on earth as it is in heaven. Give us this day our daily bread. And forgive us our trespasses, as we forgive those who trespass against us. And lead us not into temptation; but deliver us from evil. Amen.	Aayo kinnoon, Spoohtsi kitsitaopi Kitsinihkaʼsimi ikainaiiyiʼtsiʼp; Naakoohk itoʼtoohpinaan anniihk kitsiʼtaamipaitapiiyssini, Aann kaanistaiʼtaam iksimsstatoʼpi kookoowaayi spoohtsi, Aann akoohkattanistaisiiwa anno ksaahkoyi. Kokkinaan naahksowatoʼpinnaani annohk ksiistoikoi; Noohk aisskahsiʼtsit nipahtsaʼpssinnaanistsi, Aann naanistaisskahsiʼtsiʼpinnaani naanistaipahtsiistotootsipinnaani. Miinoohk itoʼtsiipiookinnaan iiyikoyi, ooki noohksikamotssiipiookinnaan Aamoistsiyay noohkaohsiihkatooʼpi. Amen.

== Bibliography ==
- Baldwin, S. J. (1994). "Blackfoot Neologisms". International Journal of American Linguistics. 60 (1): 69–72. doi:10.1086/466218. JSTOR 1265481. S2CID 224808614.
- Berman, H. (2006, April 1). Studies in Blackfoot Prehistory. Retrieved February 12, 2016,
- Bortolin, Leah and Sean McLennan. A Phonetic Analysis of Blackfoot. MS, University of Calgary, 1995.
- Denzer-King, R. (n.d.). Google Books. Retrieved February 12, 2016
- Derrick, D. (n.d.). Syllabification and Blackfoot. Retrieved February 10, 2016, from http://www.ece.ubc.ca/~donaldd/publications/proceedings_NWLC22_donald_der rick.pdf
- Frantz, Donald G. and Norma Jean Russell. Blackfoot Dictionary of Stems, Roots, and Affixes, Toronto: University of Toronto Press, 2017. ISBN 9781487520632 (Second edition published 1995, ISBN 0-8020-0767-8). (First edition published 1989, ISBN 0-8020-2691-5).
- Frantz, Donald G. (2017) [1991]. Blackfoot Grammar. Toronto: University of Toronto Press. ISBN 9781487520649. (Second edition published 1997, ISBN 0-8020-7978-4).
- Gick, B.; Bliss, H.; Michelson, K.; Radanov, B. (2012). "Articulation without acoustics: 'Soundless' vowels in Oneida and Blackfoot". Journal of Phonetics. 40: 46–53. doi:10.1016/j.wocn.2011.09.002.
- Geers, Gerardus Johannes, "The Adverbial and Prepositional Prefixes in Blackfoot", dissertation. Leiden, 1921
- Hanks (1954). "A Psychological Exploration in the Blackfoot Language". International Journal of American Linguistics. 20 (3): 195–205. doi:10.1086/464277. JSTOR 1263343. S2CID 145249192.
- Kipp, Darrell, Joe Fisher (Director) (1991). Transitions: Destruction of a Mother Tongue. Native Voices Public Television Workshop. Archived from the original on January 4, 2013.
- Mithun, Marianne (1999). The Languages of Native North America. Cambridge: Cambridge University Press. ISBN 0-521-29875-X.
- Miyashita, M. (2011). "Five Blackfoot Lullabies". Proceedings of the American Philosophical Society. 155 (3): 276–293. JSTOR 23208685.
- Uhlenbeck, C.C. A Concise Blackfoot Grammar Based on Material from the Southern Peigans, New York: AMS, 1978. (Originally published 1938 by Hollandsche Uitgevers-Maatschappij, Amsterdam, in series Verhandelingen der Koninklijke Akademie van Wetenschappen te Amsterdam, Afdeeling Letterkunde. Nieuwe Reeks, Deel XLI) ISBN 0-404-15976-1
- Uhlenbeck, C.C. An English-Blackfoot Vocabulary, New York: AMS, 1979. (Originally published 1930 in series: Verhandelingen der Koninklijke Akademie van Wetenschappen te Amsterdam, Afd. Letterkunde, Nieuwe Reeks, Deel 29, No. 4) ISBN 0-404-15796-3
- Uhlenbeck, C.C. and R.H. van Gulik. A Blackfoot-English Vocabulary Based on Material from the Southern Peigans, Amsterdam: Uitgave van de N.V. Noord-Hollandsche Uitgevers-Jaatschapp-ij, 1934. (Verhandelingen der Koninklijke Akademie Van WetenSchappen te Amsterdam. Afdeeling Letterkunde, Nieuwe Reeks, Deel XXXIII, No. 2)
- Uhlenbeck-Melchior, Wilhelmina Maria (2005). Montana 1911 : a professor and his wife among the Blackfeet : Wilhelmina Maria Uhlenbeck-Melchior's diary and C. C. Uhlenbeck's original Blackfoot texts and a new series of Blackfoot texts (2005 ed.). Calgary: University of Calgary Press. ISBN 9780803218284.
- Uhlenbeck, Christianus Cornelius. 1912. A new series of Blackfoot texts: from the southern Peigans Blackfoot Reservation Teton County Montana. (Verhandelingen der Koninklijke Akademie van Wetenschappen te Amsterdam, Afdeeling Letterkunde, N.R. 13.1.) Amsterdam: Müller. x+264pp. Retrieved from
- Uhlenbeck, Christianus Cornelius. 1938. A Concise Blackfoot Grammar. Amsterdam: Noord-Hollandsche Uitgevers-Maatschappij. Retrieved from
