= Rob Kapilow =

American musician (born 1952)

Robert Kapilow
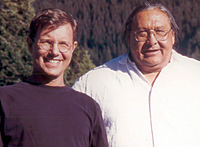
- Composer Robert Kapilow (left) and writer Darrell Kipp.
- Born: December 22, 1952 (age 73)
- Education: Yale University, Eastman School of Music
- Occupations: Composer, Conductor, Music commentator
- Known for: What Makes It Great?, Green Eggs and Ham musical setting

Robert Kapilow (born December 22, 1952) is an American composer, conductor, and music commentator. He is a Phi Beta Kappa graduate of Yale University, a graduate of the Eastman School of Music, and a student of Nadia Boulanger. He initially gained recognition for his classical music radio program, What Makes It Great?, which was under the umbrella of National Public Radio's Performance Today; "PT" is now a stablemate of classical programs produced by American Public Media. "What Makes It Great?" is part of NPR's NPR Music website. On the program he presented live full-length concert evenings and series throughout North America. Kapilow's program became a recurring event at New York's Lincoln Center (where Kapilow has the distinction of being the only artist to have his own series), in Boston, Los Angeles and Kansas City among other venues. In 2014 "What Makes It Great?" relocated to Merkin Hall at Kaufman Music Center, where Kapilow was a 2019-20 Artist-in-Residence.

As a G. Schirmer exclusive composer, Kapilow wrote the first musical setting of Dr. Seuss's Green Eggs and Ham, which was premiered and recorded by the New Jersey Chamber Music Society in 1995. It has since achieved great popularity in the children's theater world, prompting Boston Globe music critic Richard Dyer to name it "the most popular children's piece since Peter and the Wolf". A prolific composer of symphonic works, Kapilow has written pieces for the Kansas City Symphony, the National Symphony Orchestra, the Louisiana Philharmonic, the Saint Louis Symphony, the Helena Symphony, and the Minnesota Orchestra, among others. He has also written an opera, Many Moons, based on the James Thurber story, with a libretto by Hilary Blecher. Kapilow was a featured composer on Chicago Public Radio's Composers In America series and is a recipient of an Exxon "Meet-the-Composer" grant and numerous ASCAP awards. His setting of Chris Van Alsburg's Polar Express with Nathan Gunn and the Metamorphosis Chamber Orchestra and Dr. Seuss's Gertrude McFuzz with Isabel Leonard was recorded by Roven Records in 2014.

As a conductor, Kapilow has led such orchestras as the Philadelphia Orchestra, the Cleveland Orchestra, the National Symphony Orchestra, the Minnesota Orchestra, the Toronto Symphony, the Detroit Symphony, the St. Louis Symphony, the St. Paul Chamber Orchestra, and the Hagen Symphony, among others. He has also conducted stage works including performances of a Lukas Foss opera, performances with the American Repertory Theatre, and over 300 performances of the Tony Award-winning musical Nine on Broadway.

Kapilow was also music director of the Yale Symphony Orchestra and Opera New England, as well as assistant conductor of the Opera Company of Boston and the Bridgeport Symphony. He was an assistant professor of music for six years at Yale University and has lectured and taught at universities throughout America. His two books, All You Have to Do Is Listen: Music from the Inside Out, and What Makes it Great?: Short Masterpieces, Great Composers are published by John Wiley & Sons.
