= Darrell Kipp =

Darrell R. Kipp
- Blackfoot: Apiniokio Peta ("Morning Eagle")
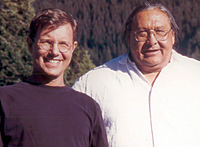
- Darrell Kipp (right) and composer Robert Kapilow (left).

Blackfeet Nation leader

Personal details
- Born: October 23, 1944 Browning, Montana
- Died: November 21, 2013 (aged 69) Browning, Montana
- Spouse: Roberta Ray Kipp
- Children: Darren Kipp
- Parent(s): Tom and Nora Kipp
- Education: Eastern Montana College, Ed.M, Harvard Graduate School of Education, 1975, MFA, Vermont College
- Known for: Revitalizing the Blackfoot language

Darrell Robes Kipp (Blackfeet, 23 October 1944 - 21 November 2013) was a Native American educator, documentary filmmaker, and historian. Kipp was an enrolled member of the Blackfeet Nation in Montana and was instrumental in teaching and preserving the Blackfoot language as the director of the Piegan Institute.

== Biography ==
Darrell Kipp was born into the Blackfeet Nation in Browning, Montana, the site of their tribal headquarters. He graduated from Browning High School in 1962. During the Vietnam War era, he served as a Sergeant in B Company, 51st Signal Battalion US Army in Korea, along the Korean DMZ.

He attended Eastern Montana College. He later earned two master's degrees, an Ed.M from the Harvard Graduate School of Education in 1975 and an MFA from Vermont College.

After working as a technical writer, in the early 1980s, Kipp returned to the Blackfeet reservation to study Piegan, the Blackfoot language. Learning that its practice had declined and many native speakers were elders, he and a small group of friends began to work on language revitalization. They first organized the Piegan Institute, a nonprofit devoted to the restoration and preservation of Native American languages. To develop fluent speakers, they also organized a center for language immersion studies, opening it in 1995 as the privately funded Nizipuhwahsin (or Real Speak) Center. It originally taught students in grades from kindergarten through eighth grade.

With the institute, Kipp ultimately developed two immersion schools for teaching the Blackfoot language: Moccasin Flat School and Cuts Wood School. He served on the board of the Endangered Language Fund and "inspired and encouraged many tribal communities to follow his lead to begin their own language immersion schools."

He served as a board member of Siyeh Development, the economic development organization of the Blackfoot tribe. He also served for seventeen years as an appellate judge on the tribal court.

In 2004 he joined composer Robert Kapilow to write the libretto for a large-scale choral and orchestra work to mark the Lewis and Clark Bicentennial. The work, entitled Summer Sun, Winter Moon, was jointly commissioned by the Kansas City Symphony, the Saint Louis Symphony, and the Louisiana Symphony, and was based on Kipp's libretto. It premiered in September 2004. A documentary of the event, sponsored by the National Endowment for the Arts, was made and aired on public television.

Kipp wrote the introduction to the second edition of the book Mythology of the Blackfoot Indians (compiled and translated by Clark Wissler and D. C. Duvall), published by Bison Books in 2008.

He received the Montana Governor's Humanities Award in 2005. He received the Trustee Award for Contributions to Montana History from the Montana Historical Society in 2006.

== See also ==
- Blackfeet
- Blackfoot language
