= John Tims =

Canadian archdeacon

John William Tims was Archdeacon of Calgary from 1898 to 1912.

Born in Oxford, England, on 24 December 1857, Tims was educated at the Church Missionary Society College, Islington and ordained in 1884. He lived with the Blackfoot from 1883 to 1895 and learnt their language, and created a grammar and dictionary of the language. Selections from the Gospel of Matthew were published in 1887 by the Church Missionary Society (CMS) Mission Press. In 1888 he created a syllabic script, similar to Cree, for Blackfoot, for his Bible translation work. He also wrote the language in the Roman (Latin) alphabet. Parts of the Bible were translated by Rev. John William Tims. In 1890 he published the full Gospel of Matthew in Roman script by the British and Foreign Bible Society. He also published other Bible portions in Roman script, with the Society for Promoting Christian Knowledge (SPCK).

He then served as Anglican Archdeacon.

From 1916 to 1943 Tims served as Rector to the St Paul's Anglican Church at Midnapore, Calgary, Alberta. He died there on 11 September 1945 aged 87.
