= Blackfoot Confederacy =

Name of a linguistically related group

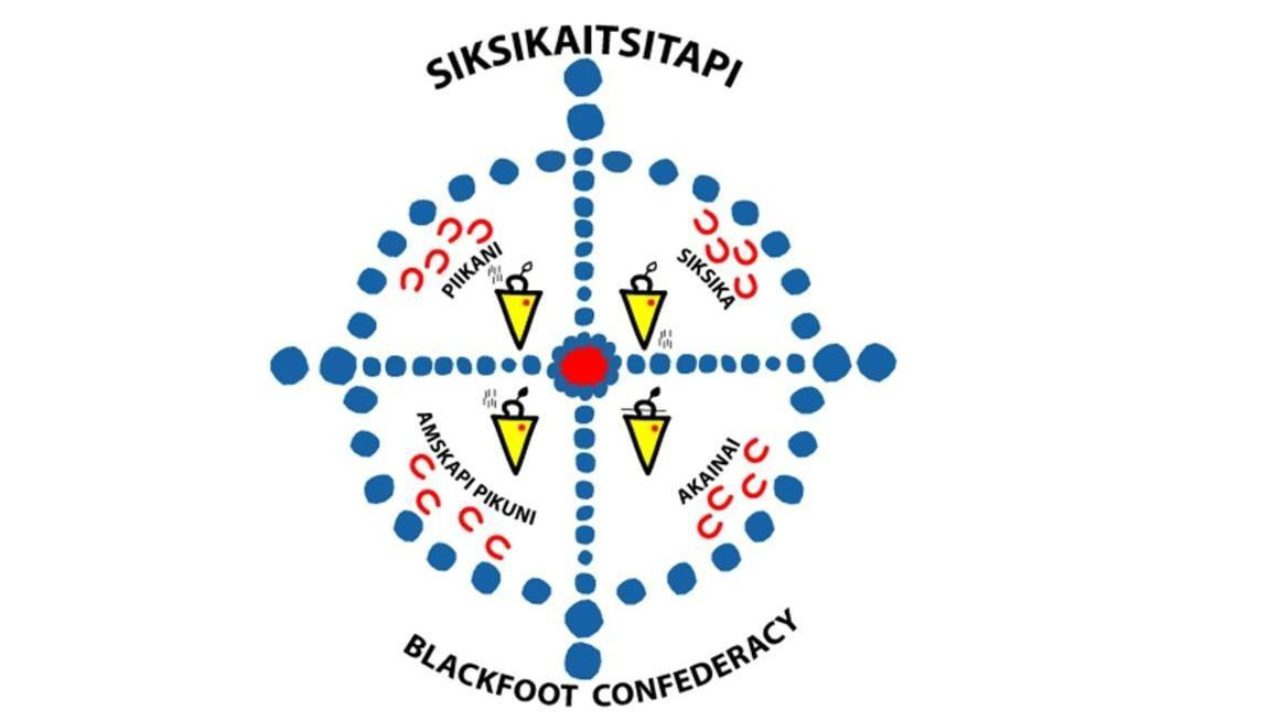
- Flag of the Blackfoot Confederacy

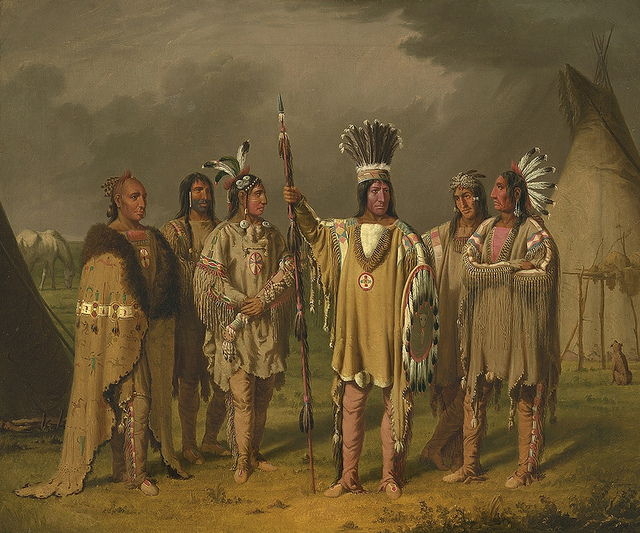
- Six chiefs of the Blackfoot Confederacy in 1859
- Type: Military alliance
- Origins: Great Plains
- Members: Kainai Nation; Piegan Blackfeet; Piikani Nation; Siksika Nation
- Official language: Blackfoot language

The Blackfoot Confederacy, Niitsítapi, or Siksikáí'tsitapi (ᖹᒧᐧᒣᑯ, meaning "the people" or "Blackfoot-speaking real people" (Note: Compare to Ojibwe: Anishinaabeg and Quinnipiac: Eansketambawg)), is a historic collective name for linguistically related groups that make up the Blackfoot or Blackfeet people: the Siksika ("Blackfoot"), the Kainai ("Many Chiefs") or Blood, and two sections of the Peigan or Piegan or Piikani ("Splotchy Robe") – the Northern Piikani (Aapátohsipikáni) and the Southern Piikani (Amskapi Piikani or Pikuni). Broader definitions include groups such as the Tsúùtínà (Sarcee) and A'aninin (Gros Ventre) who spoke quite different languages but allied with or joined the Blackfoot Confederacy.

Historically, the member peoples of the Confederacy were nomadic bison hunters and trout fishermen, who ranged across large areas of the northern Great Plains of western North America, specifically the semi-arid shortgrass prairie ecological region. They followed the bison herds as they migrated between what are now the United States and Canada, as far north as the Bow River. In the first half of the 18th century, they acquired horses and firearms from white traders and their Cree and Assiniboine go-betweens. The Blackfoot used these to expand their territory at the expense of neighboring tribes.

Today, three Blackfoot First Nation band governments (the Siksika, Kainai, and Piikani Nations) reside in the Canadian province of Alberta, while the Blackfeet Nation is a federally recognized Native American tribe of Southern Piikani in Montana, United States. Additionally, the Gros Ventre are members of the federally recognized Fort Belknap Indian Community of the Fort Belknap Reservation of Montana in the United States and the Tsuutʼina Nation is a First Nation band government in Alberta, Canada.

== Government ==
The four Blackfoot nations come together to make up what is known as the Blackfoot Confederacy, meaning that they have banded together to help one another. The nations have their own separate governments ruled by a head chief, but regularly come together for religious and social celebrations.

Originally the Blackfoot/Plains Confederacy consisted of three peoples ("nation", "tribes", "tribal nations") based on kinship and dialect, but all speaking the common language of Blackfoot, one of the Algonquian languages family. The three were the Piikáni (historically called "Piegan Blackfeet" in English-language sources), the Káínaa (called "Bloods"), and the Siksikáwa ("Blackfoot"). They later allied with the unrelated Tsuu T'ina ("Sarcee"), who became merged into the Confederacy and, (for a time) with the Atsina, or A'aninin (Gros Ventre).

Each of these highly decentralized peoples were divided into many bands, which ranged in size from 10 to 30 lodges, or about 80 to 240 persons. The band was the basic unit of organization for hunting and defence.

The Confederacy occupied a large territory where they hunted and foraged; in the 19th century it was divided by the current Canada–US international border. But during the late nineteenth century, both governments forced the peoples to end their nomadic traditions and settle on "Indian reserves" (Canadian terminology) or "Indian reservations" (US terminology). The South Peigan are the only group who chose to settle in Montana. The other three Blackfoot-speaking peoples and the Sarcee are located in Alberta. Together, the Blackfoot-speakers call themselves the Niitsítapi (the "Original People"). After leaving the Confederacy, the Gros Ventres also settled on a reservation in Montana.

When these peoples were forced to end their nomadic traditions, their social structures changed. Tribal nations, which had formerly been mostly ethnic associations, were institutionalized as governments (referred to as "tribes" in the United States and "bands" or "First Nations" in Canada). The Piegan were divided into the North Peigan in Alberta, and the South Peigan in Montana.

== History ==
The Confederacy had a territory that stretched from the North Saskatchewan River (called Ponoká'sisaahta) along what is now Edmonton, Alberta, in Canada, to the Yellowstone River (called Otahkoiitahtayi) of Montana in the United States, and from the Rocky Mountains (called Miistakistsi) and along the South Saskatchewan River to the present Alberta-Saskatchewan border (called Kaayihkimikoyi), east past the Cypress Hills. They called their tribal territory Niitsitpiis-stahkoii (ᖹᐟᒧᐧᐨᑯᐧ ᓴᐦᖾᐟ)- "Original People s Land." To the east, the Innu and Naskapi called their territory Nitassinan – "Our Land." They had adopted the use of the horse from other Plains tribes, probably by the early eighteenth century, which gave them expanded range and mobility, as well as advantages in hunting.

The basic social unit of the Niitsitapi above the family was the band, varying from about 10 to 30 lodges, about 80 to 241 people. This size group was large enough to defend against attack and to undertake communal hunts, but was also small enough for flexibility. Each band consisted of a respected leader, possibly his brothers and parents, and others who were not related. Since the band was defined by place of residence, rather than by kinship, a person was free to leave one band and join another, which tended to ameliorate leadership disputes. Also, should a band fall upon hard times, its members could split up and join other bands. In practice, bands were constantly forming and breaking up. The system maximized flexibility and was an ideal organization for a hunting people on the northwestern Great Plains.

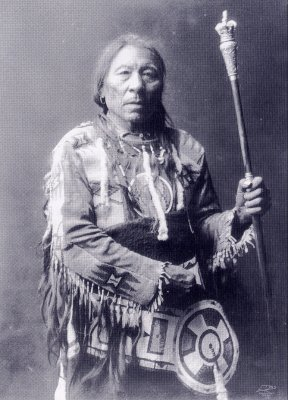
Chief Aatsista-Mahkan, c.1905.

During the summer, the people assembled for nation gatherings. In these large assemblies, warrior societies played an important role for the men. Membership into these societies was based on brave acts and deeds.

For almost half the year in the long northern winter, the Niitsitapi lived in their winter camps along a wooded river valley. They were located perhaps a day's march apart, not moving camp unless food for the people and horses, or firewood became depleted. Where there was adequate wood and game resources, some bands would camp together. During this part of the year, buffalo also wintered in wooded areas, where they were partially sheltered from storms and snow. They were easier prey as their movements were hampered. In spring the buffalo moved out onto the grasslands to forage on new spring growth. The Blackfoot did not follow immediately, for fear of late blizzards. As dried food or game became depleted, the bands would split up and begin to hunt the buffalo.

In midsummer, when the chokecherries ripened, the people regrouped for their major ceremony, the Okan (Sun Dance). This was the only time of year when the four nations would assemble. The gathering reinforced the bonds among the various groups and linked individuals with the nations. Communal buffalo hunts provided food for the people, as well as offerings of the bulls' tongues (a delicacy) for the ceremonies. These ceremonies are sacred to the people. After the Okan, the people again separated to follow the buffalo. They used the buffalo hides to make their dwellings and temporary tipis.

In the fall, the people would gradually shift to their wintering areas. The men would prepare the buffalo jumps and pounds for capturing or driving the bison for hunting. Several groups of people might join at particularly good sites, such as Head-Smashed-In Buffalo Jump. As the buffalo were naturally driven into the area by the gradual late summer drying off of the open grasslands, the Blackfoot would carry out great communal buffalo kills.

The women processed the buffalo, preparing dried meat, and combining it for nutrition and flavor with dried fruits into pemmican, to last them through winter and other times when hunting was poor. At the end of the fall, the Blackfoot would move to their winter camps. The women worked the buffalo and other game skins for clothing, as well as to reinforce their dwellings; other elements were used to make warm fur robes, leggings, cords and other needed items. Animal sinews were used to tie arrow points and lances to throwing sticks, or for bridles for horses.

The Niitsitapi maintained this traditional way of life based on hunting bison, until the near extirpation of the bison by 1881 forced them to adapt their ways of life in response to the encroachment of the European settlers and their descendants. In the United States, they were restricted to land assigned in the Fort Laramie Treaty of 1851. Nearly three decades later, they were given a distinct reservation in the Sweetgrass Hills Treaty of 1887. In 1877, the Canadian Niitsitapi signed Treaty 7 and settled on reserves in southern Alberta.

This began a period of great struggle and economic hardship; the Niitsitapi had to try to adapt to a completely new way of life. They suffered a high rate of fatalities when exposed to Eurasian diseases, for which they had no natural immunity.

Eventually, they established a viable economy based on farming, ranching, and light industry. Their population has increased to about 16,000 in Canada and 15,000 in the U.S. today. With their new economic stability, the Niitsitapi have been free to adapt their culture and traditions to their new circumstances, renewing their connection to their ancient roots.

=== Early history ===
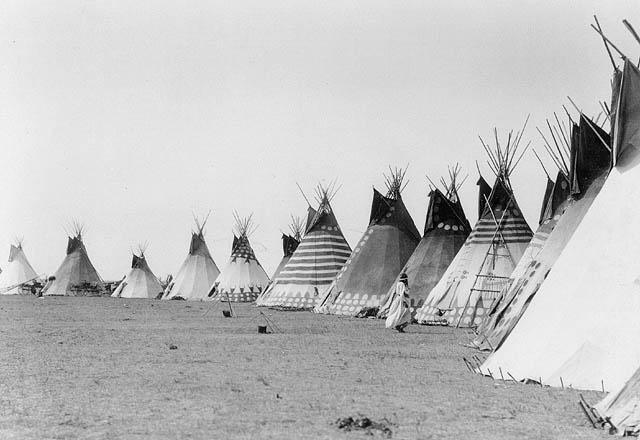
Blackfoot teepees, Glacier National Park, 1933

The Niitsitapi, also known as the Blackfoot or Blackfeet Indians, reside in the Great Plains of Montana and the Canadian provinces of Alberta and Saskatchewan. Originally, only one of the Niitsitapi tribes was called Blackfoot or Siksika. The name is said to have come from the color of the peoples' moccasins, made of leather. They had typically dyed or painted the soles of their moccasins black. One legendary story claimed that the Siksika walked through ashes of prairie fires, which in turn colored the bottoms of their moccasins black.

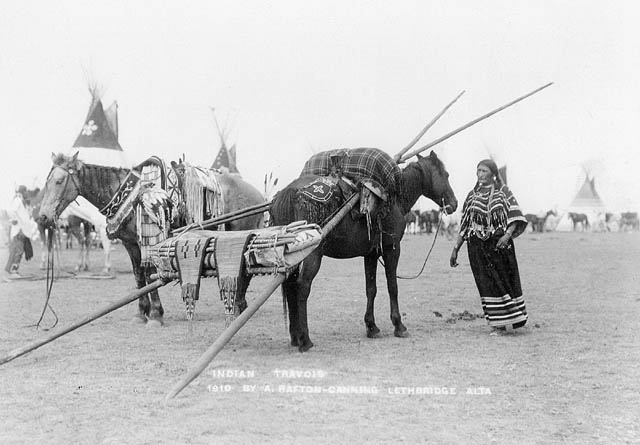
Kainai (Blood) women with travois.

Due to language and cultural patterns, anthropologists believe the Niitsitapi did not originate in the Great Plains of the Midwest North America, but migrated from the upper Northeastern part of the country. They coalesced as a group while living in the forests of what is now the Northeastern United States. They were mostly located around the border between Canada and the state of Maine. By 1200, the Niitsitapi were moving in search of more land. They moved west and settled for a while north of the Great Lakes in present-day Canada, but had to compete for resources with existing tribes. They left the Great Lakes area and kept moving west.

When they moved, they usually packed their belongings on an A-shaped sled called a travois. The travois was designed for transport over dry land. The Blackfoot had relied on dogs to pull the travois; they did not acquire horses until the 18th century. From the Great Lakes area, they continued to move west and eventually settled in the Great Plains.

The Plains had covered approximately 780,000 square miles (2,000,000 km^{2}) with the Saskatchewan River to the north, the Rio Grande to the south, the Mississippi River to the east, and the Rocky Mountains to the west. Adopting the use of the horse, the Niitsitapi established themselves as one of the most powerful Indian tribes on the Plains in the late 18th century, earning themselves the name "The Lords of the Plains." Niitsitapi stories trace their residence and possession of their plains territory to "time immemorial."

=== Importance and uses of bison ===
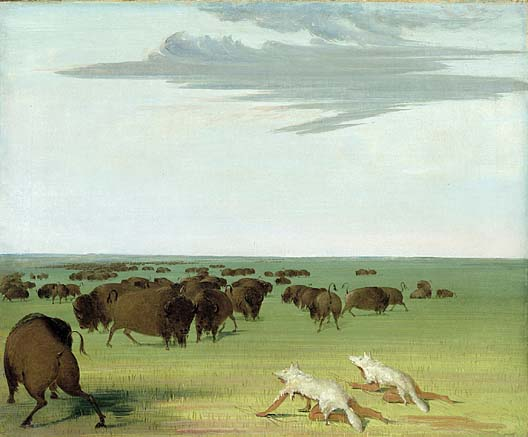
Bison hunters with wolf skin disguises.

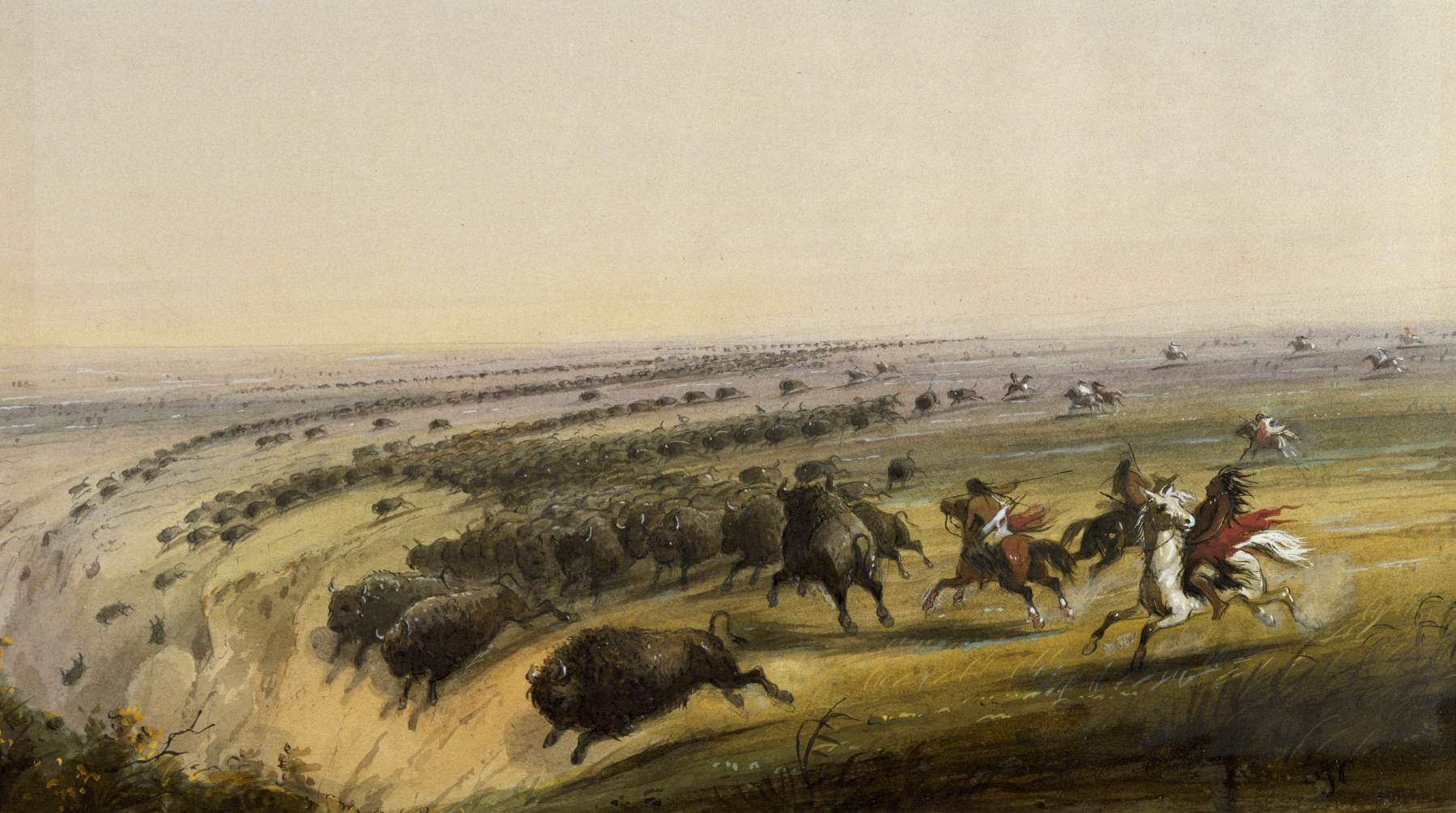
Depiction of Bison being driven over a "buffalo jump".

The Niitsitapi main source of food on the plains was the American bison (buffalo), the largest mammal in North America, standing about 6 1/2 feet (2.0 m) tall and weighing up to 2,000 pounds (910 kg). Before the introduction of horses, the Niitsitapi needed other ways to get in range. The buffalo jump was one of the most common ways. The hunters would round up the buffalo into V-shaped pens, and drive them over a cliff (they hunted pronghorn antelopes in the same way). Afterwards the hunters would go to the bottom and take as much meat as they could carry back to camp. They also used camouflage for hunting. The hunters would take buffalo skins from previous hunting trips and drape them over their bodies to blend in and mask their scent. By subtle moves, the hunters could get close to the herd. When close enough, the hunters would attack with arrows or spears to kill wounded animals.

The people used virtually all parts of the body and skin. The women prepared the meat for food: by boiling, roasting or drying for jerky. This processed it to last a long time without spoiling, and they depended on bison meat to get through the winters. The winters were long, harsh, and cold due to the lack of trees in the Plains, so people stockpiled meat in summer. As a ritual, hunters often ate the bison heart minutes after the kill. The women tanned and prepared the skins to cover the tepees. These were made of log poles, with the skins draped over it. The tepee remained warm in the winter and cool in the summer, and was a great shield against the wind.

The women also made clothing from the skins, such as robes and moccasins, and made soap from the fat. Both men and women made utensils, sewing needles and tools from the bones, using tendon for fastening and binding. The stomach and bladder were cleaned and prepared for use for storing liquids. Dried bison dung was fuel for the fires. The Niitsitapi considered the animal sacred and integral to their lives.

=== Discovery and uses of horses ===
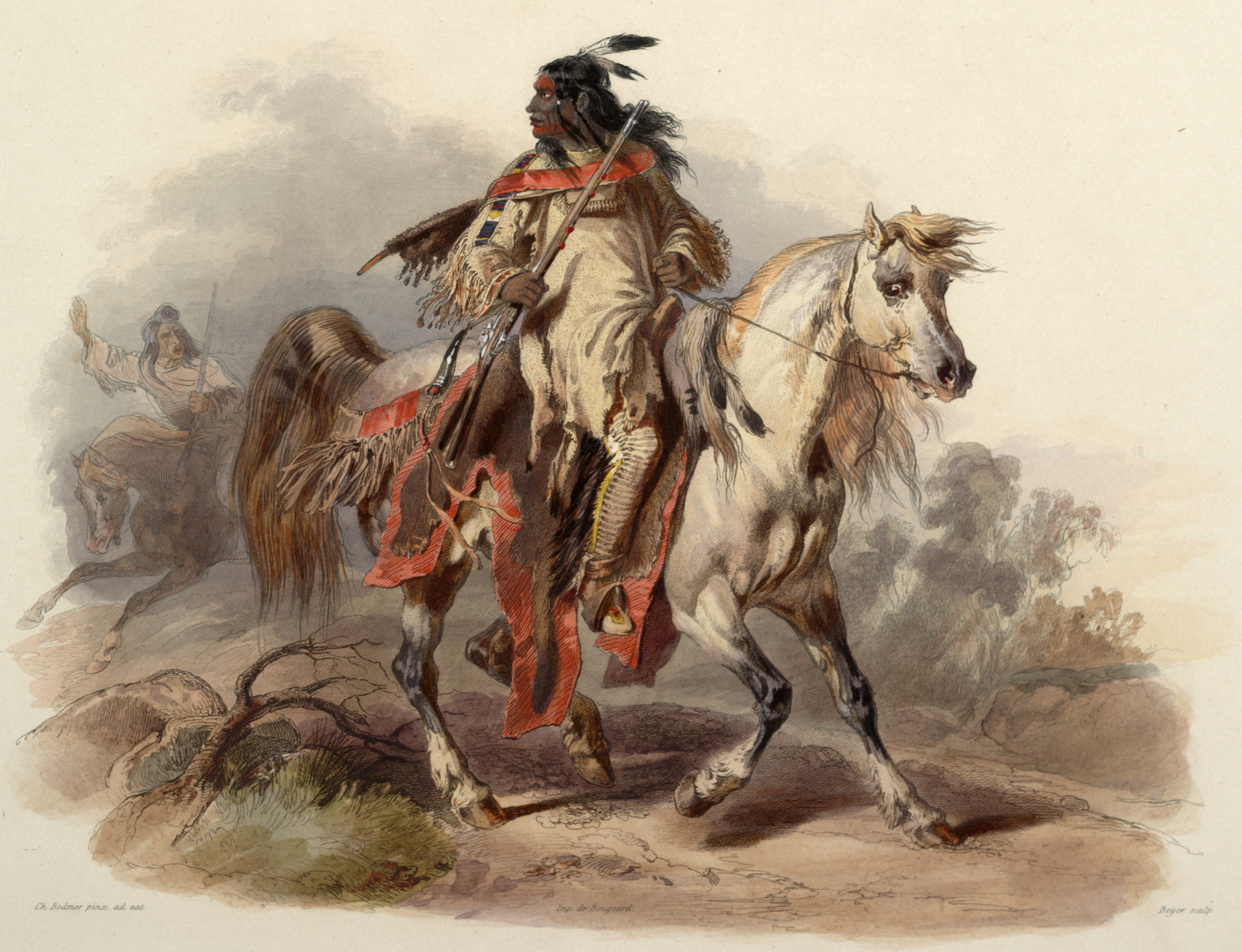
Mounted Blackfoot warrior on horse painted from life by Karl Bodmer.

Up until around 1730, the Blackfoot traveled by foot and used dogs to carry and pull some of their goods. They had not seen horses in their previous lands, but were introduced to them on the Plains, as other tribes, such as the Shoshone, had already adopted their use. They saw the advantages of horses and wanted some. The Blackfoot called the horses ponokamita (elk dogs). The horses could carry much more weight than dogs and moved at a greater speed. They could be ridden for hunting and travel.

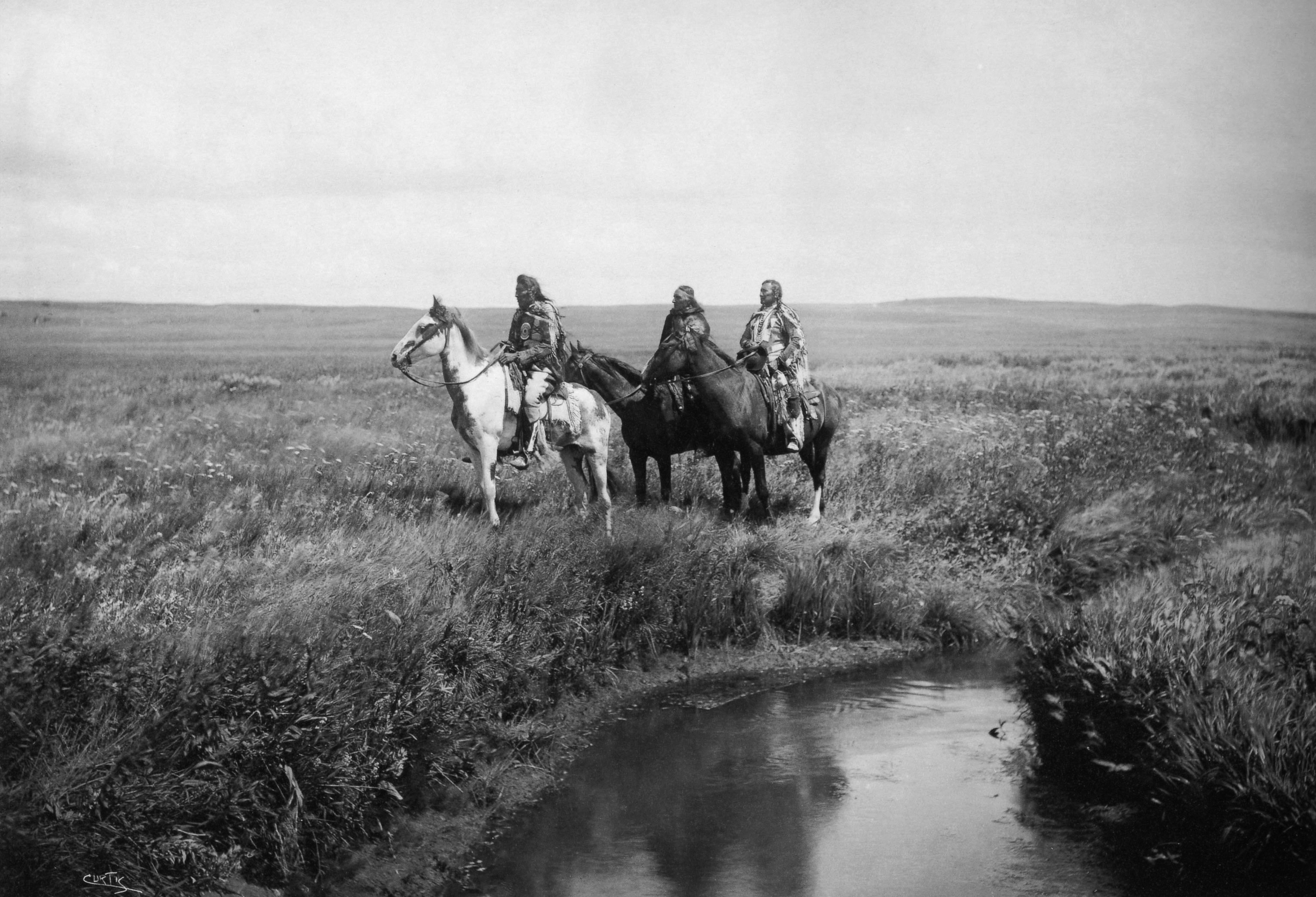
Three mounted Piegan chiefs on the prairie. Photographed by Edward S. Curtis.

Horses revolutionised life on the Great Plains and soon came to be regarded as a measure of wealth. Warriors regularly raided other tribes for their best horses. Horses were generally used as universal standards of barter. Medicine men were paid for cures and healing with horses. Those who designed shields or war bonnets were also paid in horses. The men gave horses to those who were owed gifts as well as to the needy. An individual's wealth rose with the number of horses accumulated, but a man did not keep an abundance of them. The individual's prestige and status was judged by the number of horses that he could give away. For the Indians who lived on the Plains, the principal value of property was to share it with others.

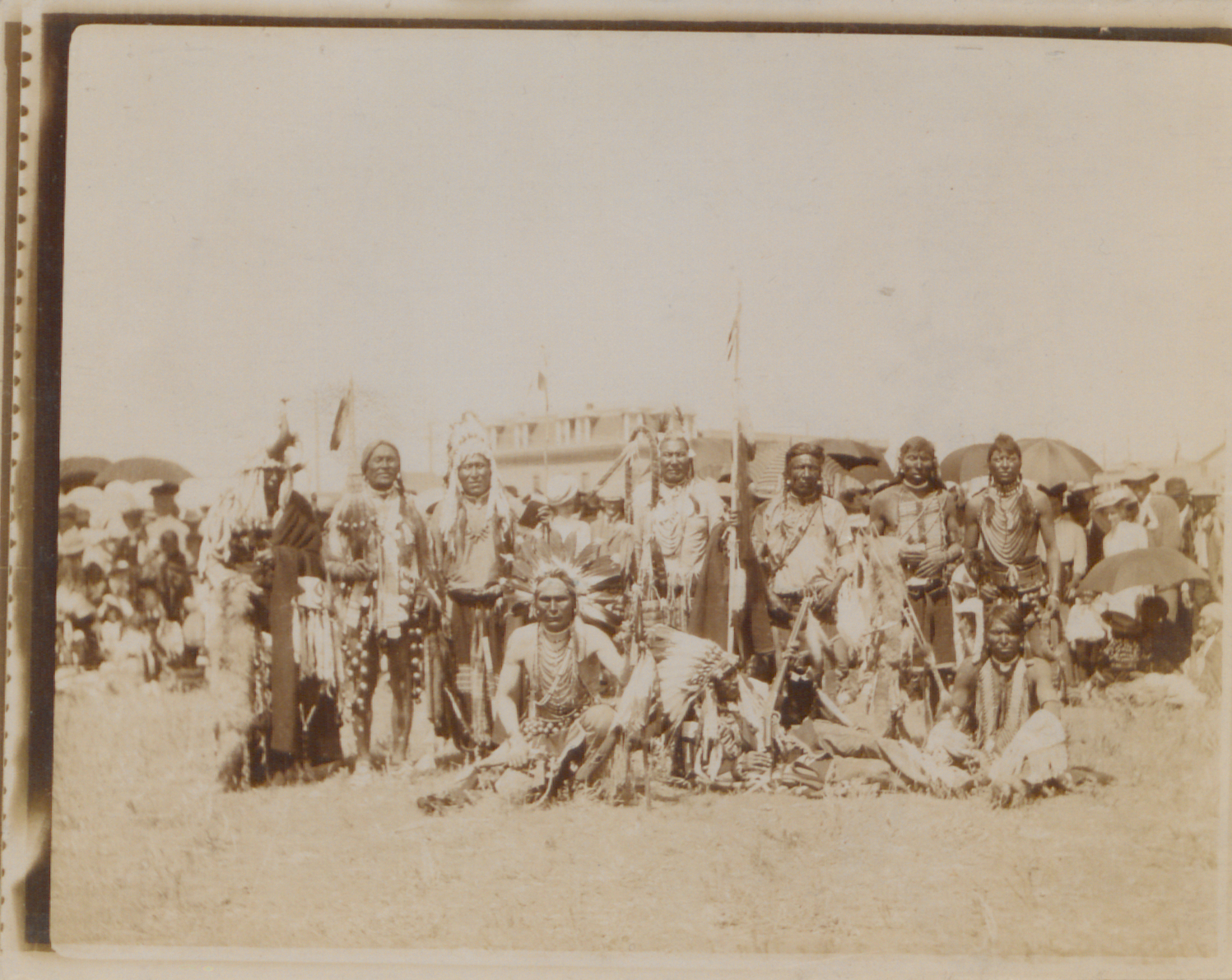
Blackfoot warriors at Fort MacLeod, 1907

After driving the hostile Shoshone and Arapaho from the Northwestern Plains, the Niitsitapi began in 1800 a long phase of keen competition in the fur trade with their former Cree allies, which often escalated militarily. In addition both groups had adapted to using horses about 1730, so by mid-century an adequate supply of horses became a question of survival. Horse theft was at this stage not only a proof of courage, but often a desperate contribution to survival, for many ethnic groups competed for hunting in the grasslands.

The Cree and Assiniboine continued horse raiding against the Gros Ventre (in Cree: Pawistiko Iyiniwak – "Rapids People" – "People of the Rapids"), allies of the Niitsitapi. The Gros Ventres were also known as Niya Wati Inew, Naywattamee ("They Live in Holes People"), because their tribal lands were along the Saskatchewan River Forks (the confluence of North and South Saskatchewan River). They had to withstand attacks of enemies with guns. In retaliation for Hudson's Bay Company (HBC) supplying their enemies with weapons, the Gros Ventre attacked and burned in 1793 South Branch House of the HBC on the South Saskatchewan River near the present village of St. Louis, Saskatchewan. Then, the tribe moved southward to the Milk River in Montana and allied themselves with the Blackfoot. The area between the North Saskatchewan River and Battle River (the name derives from the war fought between these two tribal groups) was the limit of the now warring tribal alliances.

=== Enemies and warrior culture ===
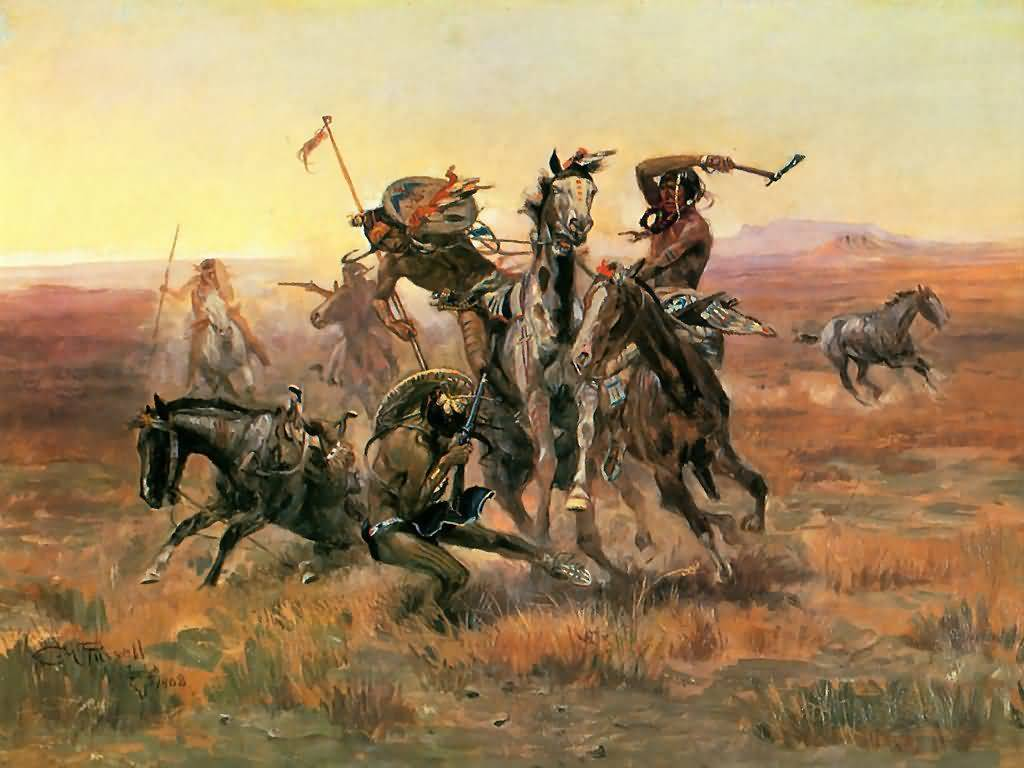
When Blackfoot and Sioux Meet by western artist Charles Marion Russell.

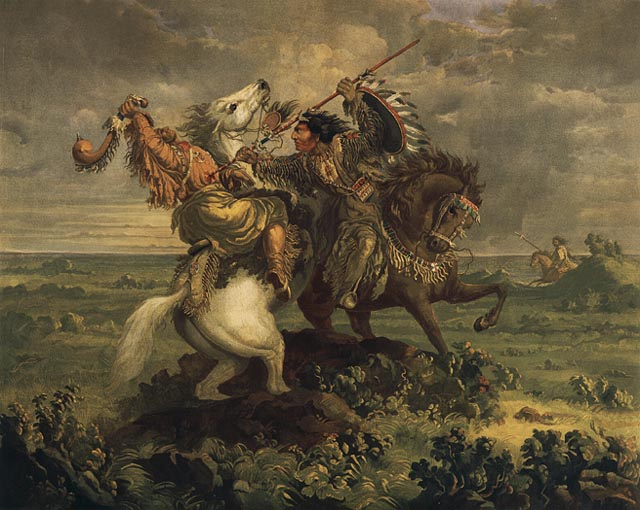
The Death of Omoxesisixany or Big Snake by Paul Kane, depicting a battle between a Blackfoot and Plains Cree warrior on horseback.

Blackfoot war parties would ride hundreds of miles on raids. A boy on his first war party was given a silly or derogatory name. But after he had stolen his first horse or killed an enemy, he was given a name to honor him. Warriors would strive to perform various acts of bravery called counting coup, in order to move up in social rank. The coups in order of importance were: taking a gun from a living enemy and or touching him directly; capturing lances, and bows; scalping an enemy; killing an enemy; freeing a tied horse from in front of an enemy lodge; leading a war party; scouting for a war party; stealing headdresses, shields, pipes (sacred ceremonial pipes); and driving a herd of stolen horses back to camp.

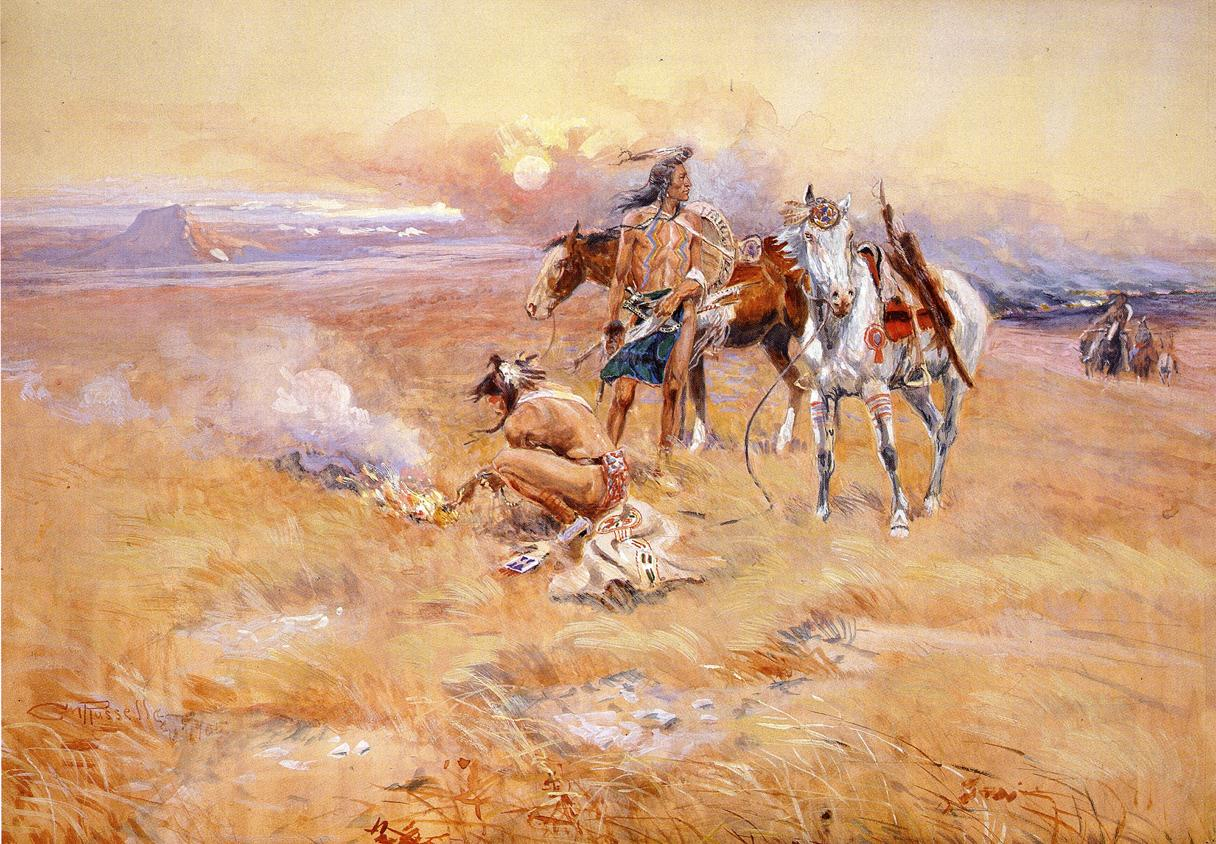
Blackfeet Burning Crow Buffalo Range by Charles Marion Russell.

The Niitsitapi were enemies of the Crow, Cheyenne (kiihtsipimiitapi – ″Pinto People″), and Sioux (Dakota, Lakota, and Nakota) (called pinaapisinaa – "East Cree") on the Great Plains; and the Shoshone, Flathead, Kalispel, Kootenai (called kotonáá'wa) and Nez Perce (called komonóítapiikoan) in the mountain country to their west and southwest. Their most mighty and most dangerous enemy, however, were the political/military/trading alliance of the Iron Confederacy or Nehiyaw-Pwat (in Plains Cree: Nehiyaw – 'Cree' and Pwat or Pwat-sak – 'Sioux, i.e. Assiniboine') – named after the dominating Plains Cree (called Asinaa) and Assiniboine (called Niitsísinaa – "Original Cree"). These included the Stoney (called Saahsáísso'kitaki or Sahsi-sokitaki – ″Sarcee trying to cut″), Saulteaux (or Plains Ojibwe), and Métis to the north, east and southeast.

With the expansion of the Nehiyaw-Pwat to the north, west and southwest, they integrated larger groups of Iroquois, Chipewyan, Danezaa (Dunneza – 'The real (prototypical) people'), Ktunaxa, Flathead, and later Gros Ventre (called atsíína – "Gut People" or "like a Cree"), in their local groups. Loosely allied with the Nehiyaw-Pwat, but politically independent, were neighboring tribes like the Ktunaxa, Secwepemc and in particular the arch enemy of the Blackfoot, the Crow, or Indian trading partners like the Nez Perce and Flathead.

The Shoshone acquired horses much sooner than the Blackfoot and soon occupied much of present-day Alberta, most of Montana, and parts of Wyoming, and raided the Blackfoot frequently. Once the Piegan gained access to horses of their own and guns, obtained from the HBC via the Cree and Assiniboine, the situation changed. By 1787 David Thompson reports that the Blackfoot had completely conquered most of Shoshone territory, and frequently captured Shoshone women and children and forcibly assimilated them into Blackfoot society, further increasing their advantages over the Shoshone. Thompson reports that Blackfoot territory in 1787 was from the North Saskatchewan River in the north to the Missouri River in the South, and from Rocky Mountains in the west out to a distance of 300 miles (480 km) to the east.

Between 1790 and 1850, the Nehiyaw-Pwat were at the height of their power; they could successfully defend their territories against the Sioux (Lakota, Nakota and Dakota) and the Niitsitapi Confederacy. During the so-called Buffalo Wars (about 1850 – 1870), they penetrated further and further into the territory from the Niitsitapi Confederacy in search for the buffalo, so that the Piegan were forced to give way in the region of the Missouri River (in Cree: Pikano Sipi – "Muddy River", "Muddy, turbid River"), the Kainai withdrew to the Bow River and Belly River; only the Siksika could hold their tribal lands along the Red Deer River. Around 1870, the alliance between the Blackfoot and the Gros Ventre broke, and the latter began to look to their former enemies, the Southern Assiniboine (or Plains Assiniboine), for protection.

=== First contact with Europeans and the fur trade ===
Anthony Henday of the Hudson's Bay Company (HBC) met a large Blackfoot group in 1754 in what is now Alberta. The Blackfoot had established dealings with traders connected to the Canadian and English fur trade before meeting the Lewis and Clark Expedition in 1806. Lewis and Clark and their men had embarked on mapping the Louisiana Territory and upper Missouri River for the United States government.

On their return trip from the Pacific Coast, Lewis and three of his men encountered a group of young Blackfoot warriors with a large herd of horses, and it was clear to Meriwether Lewis that they were not far from much larger groups of warriors. Lewis explained to them that the United States government wanted peace with all Indian nations, and that the US leaders had successfully formed alliances with other Indian nations. The group camped together that night, and at dawn there was a scuffle as it was discovered that the Blackfoot were trying to steal guns and run off with their horses while the Americans slept. In the ensuing struggle, one warrior was fatally stabbed and another shot by Lewis and presumed killed.

In subsequent years, American mountain men trapping in Blackfoot country generally encountered hostility. When John Colter, a member of the Lewis and Clark Expedition, returned to Blackfoot country soon after, he barely escaped with his life. In 1809, Colter and his companion were trapping on the Jefferson River by canoe when they were surrounded by hundreds of Blackfoot warriors on horseback on both sides of the river bank. Colter's companion, John Potts, did not surrender and was killed. Colter was stripped of his clothes and forced to run for his life, after being given a head start (famously known in the annals of the West as "Colter's Run.") He eventually escaped by reaching a river five miles away and diving under either an island of driftwood or a beaver dam, where he remained concealed until after nightfall. He trekked another 300 miles to a fort.

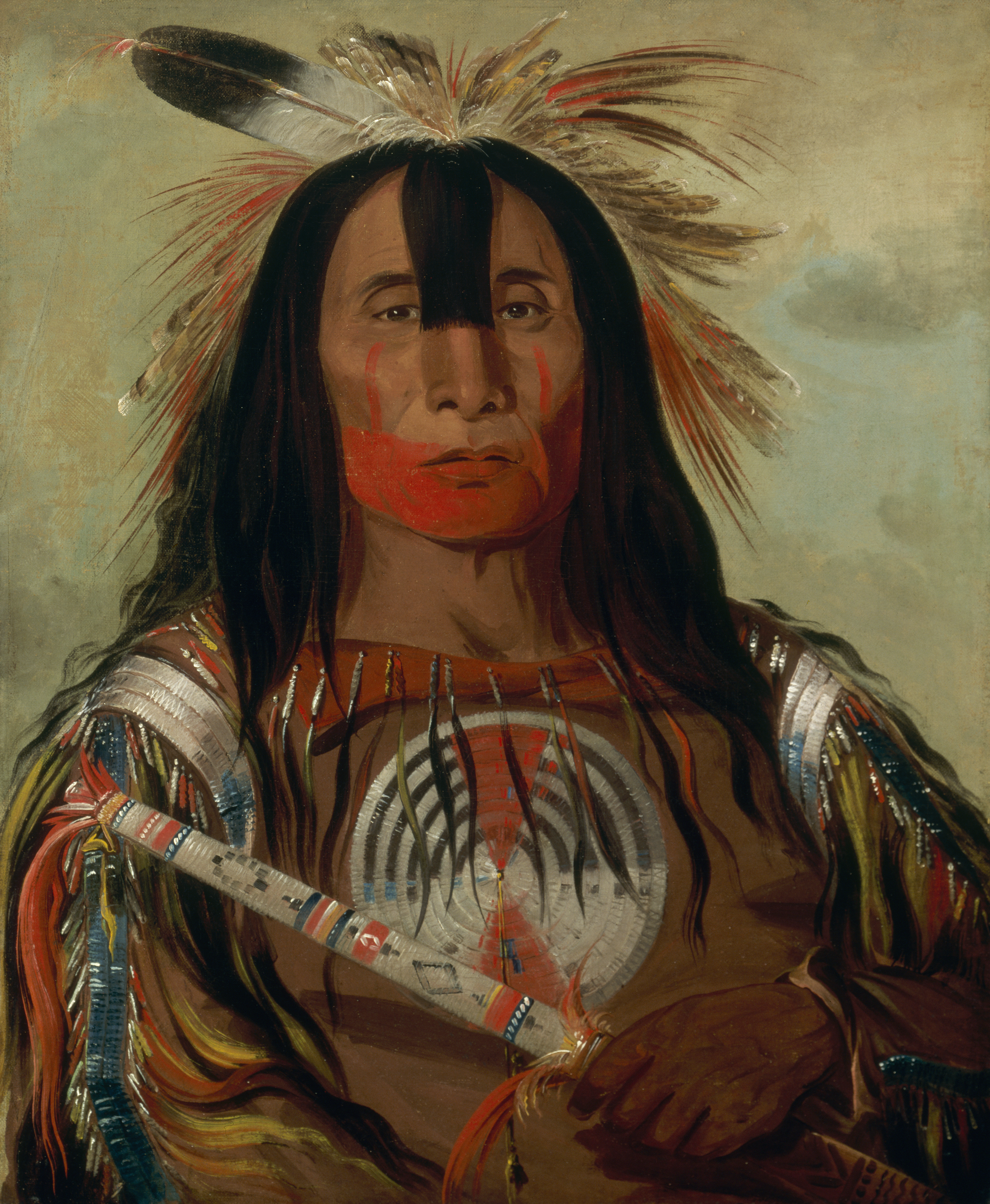
Buffalo Bull's Back Fat, Head Chief, of the Blood Tribe by George Catlin.

In the context of shifting tribal politics due to the spread of horses and guns, the Niitsitapi initially tried to increase their trade with the HBC traders in Rupert's Land whilst blocking access to the HBC by neighboring peoples to the West. But the HBC trade eventually reached into what is now inland British Columbia.

By the late 1820s, [this prompted] the Niitsitapiksi, and in particular the Piikani, whose territory was rich in beaver, [to] temporarily put aside cultural prohibitions and environmental constraints to trap enormous numbers of these animals and, in turn, receive greater quantities of trade items.

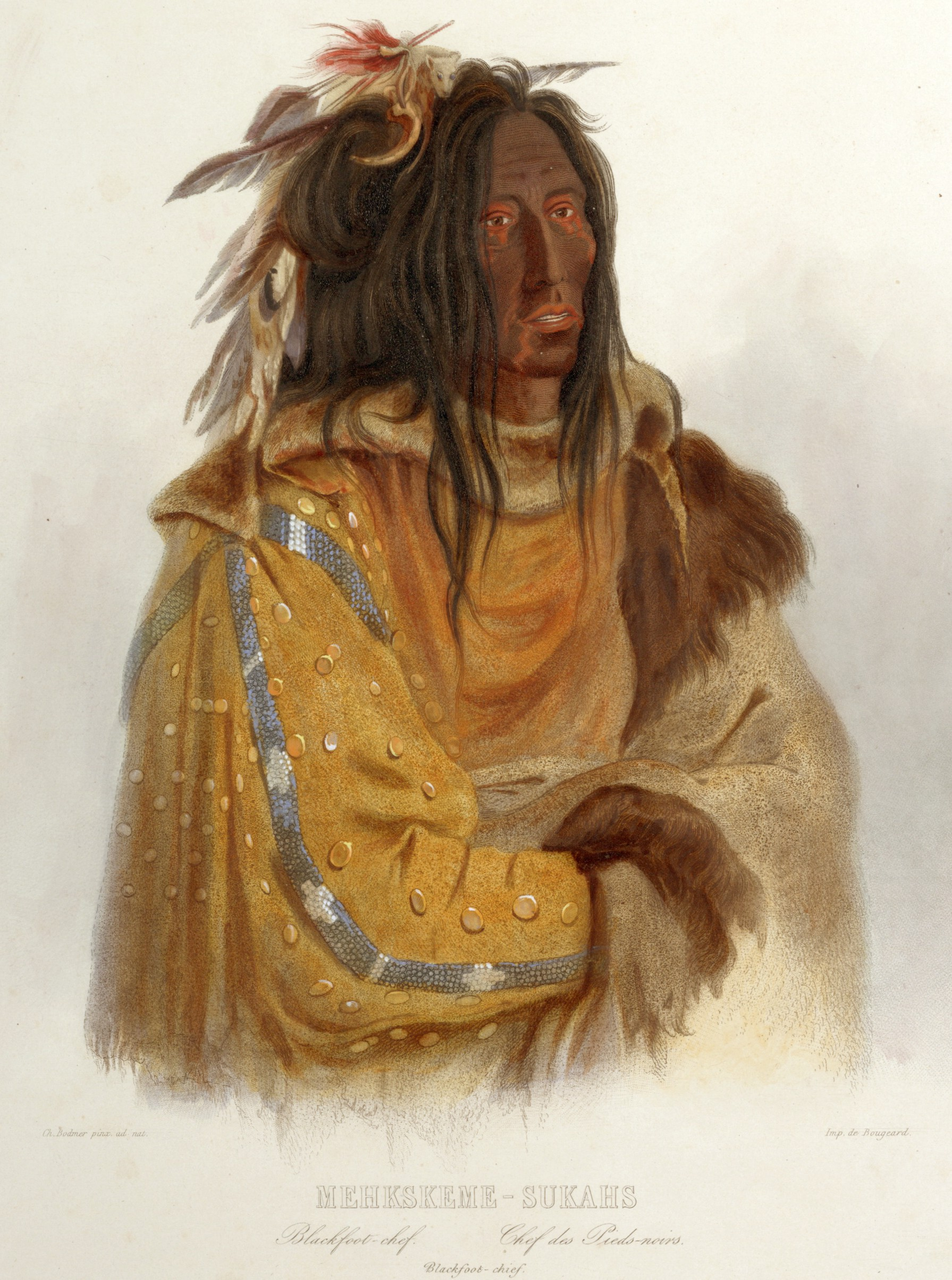
Mehkskeme-Sukahs, Blackfoot chief (c. 1840).

The HBC encouraged Niitsitapiksi to trade by setting up posts on the North Saskatchewan River, on the northern boundary of their territory. In the 1830s the Rocky Mountain region and the wider Saskatchewan District were the HBC's most profitable, and Rocky Mountain House was the HBC's busiest post. It was primarily used by the Piikani. Other Niitsitapiksi nations traded more in pemmican and buffalo skins than beaver, and visited other posts such as Fort Edmonton.

Meanwhile, in 1822, the American Fur Company entered the Upper Missouri region from the south for the first time, without Niitsitapiksi permission. This led to tensions and conflict until 1830, when peaceful trade was established. This was followed by the opening of Fort Piegan as the first American trading post in Niitsitapi territory in 1831, joined by Fort MacKenzie in 1833. The Americans offered better terms of trade and were more interested in buffalo skins than the HBC, which brought them more trade from the Niitsitapi. The HBC responded by building Bow Fort (Peigan Post) on the Bow River in 1832, but it was not a success.

In 1833, German explorer Prince Maximilian of Wied-Neuwied and Swiss painter Karl Bodmer spent months with the Niitsitapi to get a sense of their culture. Bodmer portrayed their society in paintings and drawings.

Contact with the Europeans caused a spread of infectious diseases to the Niitsitapi, mostly cholera and smallpox. In one instance in 1837, an American Fur Company steamboat, the St. Peter's, was headed to Fort Union and several passengers contracted smallpox on the way. They continued to send a smaller vessel with supplies farther up the river to posts among the Niitsitapi. The Niitsitapi contracted the disease and eventually 6,000 died, marking an end to their dominance among tribes over the Plains. The Hudson's Bay Company did not require or help their employees get vaccinated; the English doctor Edward Jenner had developed a technique 41 years before but its use was not yet widespread.

=== Indian Wars ===
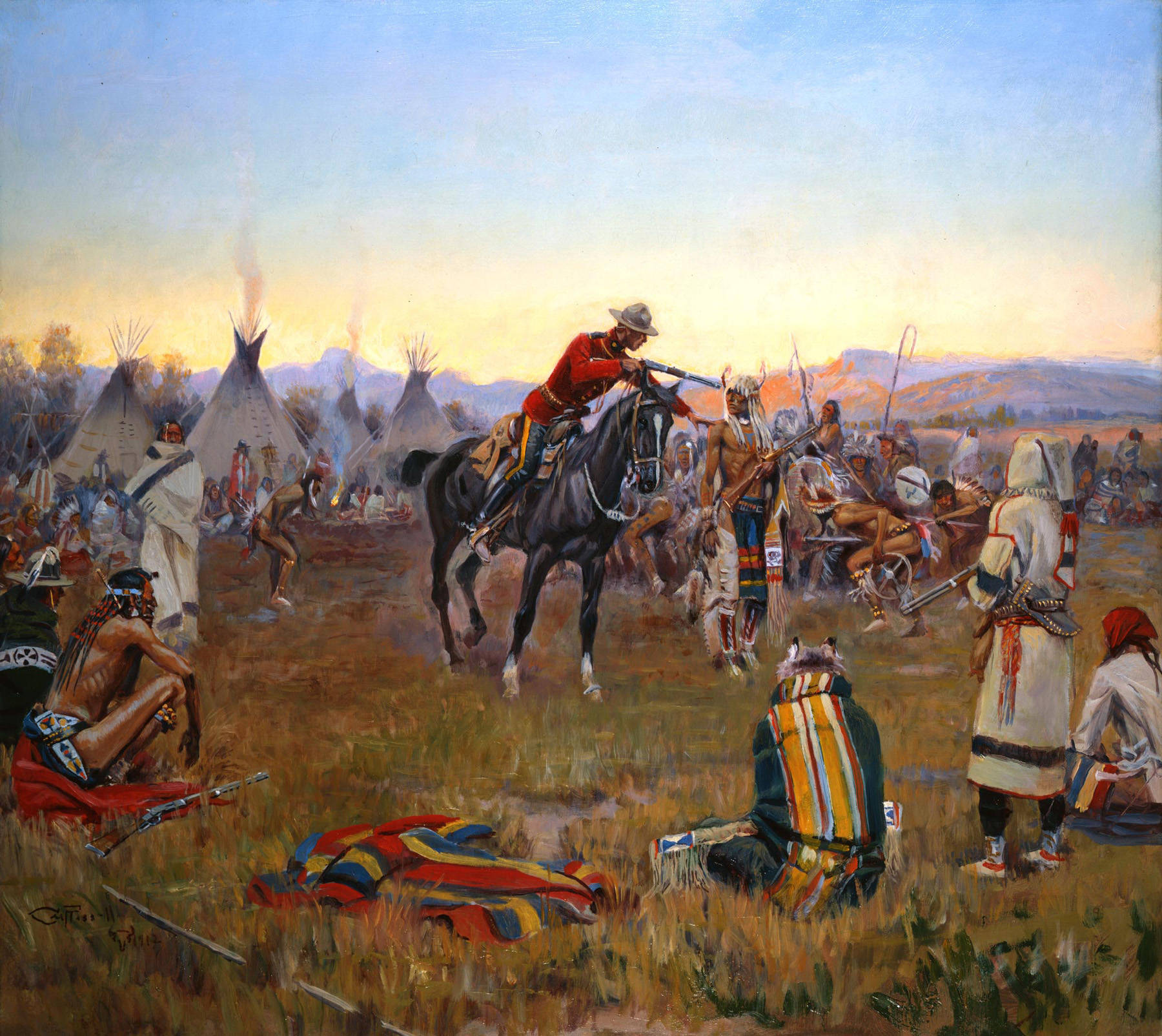
Single-Handed, Charles Marion Russell 1912. The painting shows a North-West Mounted Police officer attempting to arrest a defiant warrior at a Blood camp, probably in Alberta or Saskatchewan.

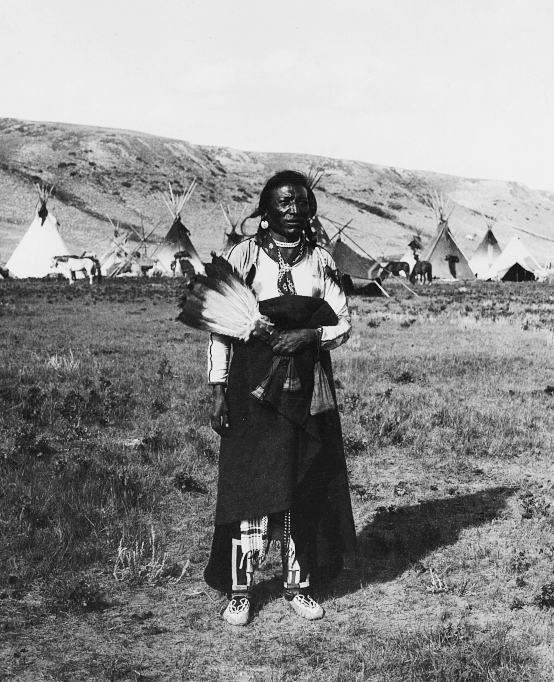
Dog Child (Winnipeg Jack), a Blackfoot scout and interpreter for the NWMP.

Like many other Great Plains Indian nations, the Niitsitapi often had hostile relationships with white settlers. Despite the hostilities, the Blackfoot stayed largely out of the Great Plains Indian Wars, neither fighting against nor scouting for the United States Army. One of their friendly bands, however, was attacked by mistake and nearly destroyed by the U.S. Army in the Marias Massacre on 23 January 1870, undertaken as an action to suppress violence against settlers. A friendly relationship with the North-West Mounted Police and learning of the brutality of the Marias Massacre discouraged the Blackfoot from engaging in wars against Canada and the United States.

When the Lakota, together with their Cheyenne and Arapaho allies, were fighting the United States Army, they sent runners into Blackfoot territory, urging them to join the fight. Crowfoot, one of the most influential Blackfoot chiefs, dismissed the Lakota messengers. He threatened to ally with the NWMP to fight them if they came north into Blackfoot country again. News of Crowfoot's loyalty reached Ottawa and from there London; Queen Victoria praised Crowfoot and the Blackfoot for their loyalty. Despite his threats, Crowfoot later met those Lakota who had fled with Sitting Bull into Canada after defeating George Armstrong Custer and his battalion at the Battle of Little Big Horn. Crowfoot considered the Lakota then to be refugees and was sympathetic to their strife, but retained his anti-war stance. Sitting Bull and Crowfoot fostered peace between the two nations by a ceremonial offering of tobacco, ending hostilities between them. Sitting Bull was so impressed by Crowfoot that he named one of his sons after him.

The Blackfoot also chose to stay out of the North-West Rebellion, led by the famous Métis leader Louis Riel. Louis Riel and his men added to the already unsettled conditions facing the Blackfoot by camping near them. They tried to spread discontent with the government and gain a powerful ally. The North-West Rebellion was made up mostly of Métis, Assiniboine (Nakota) and Plains Cree, who all fought against European encroachment and destruction of Bison herds. The Plains Cree were one of the Blackfoot's most hated enemies; however, the two nations made peace when Crowfoot adopted Poundmaker, an influential Cree chief and great peacemaker, as his son. Although he refused to fight, Crowfoot had sympathy for those with the rebellion, especially the Cree led by such notable chiefs as Poundmaker, Big Bear, Wandering Spirit and Fine-Day.

When news of continued Blackfoot neutrality reached Ottawa, Lord Lansdowne, the governor general, expressed his thanks to Crowfoot again on behalf of the Queen back in London. The cabinet of John A. Macdonald (the current Prime Minister of Canada at the time) gave Crowfoot a round of applause.

=== Further encroachment by Canada and United States ===
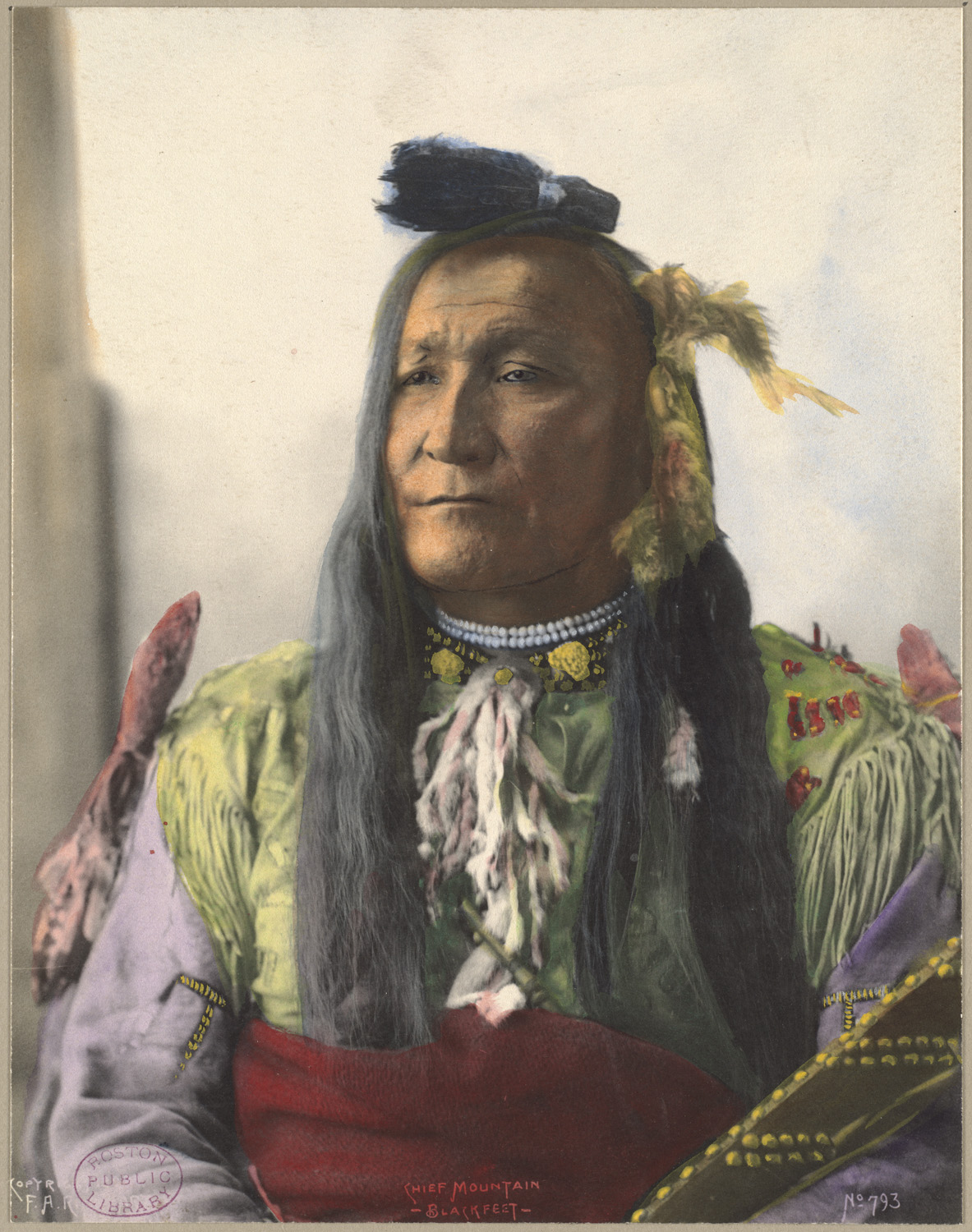
Colorized photograph of chief Mountain Chief

During the mid-1800s, the Niitsitapi faced a dwindling food supply, as European-American hunters were hired by the U.S. government to kill bison so the Blackfeet would remain in their reservation. Settlers were also encroaching on their territory. Without the buffalo, the Niitsitapi were forced to depend on the United States government for food supplies. In 1855, the Niitsitapi chief Lame Bull made a peace treaty with the United States government. The Lame Bull Treaty promised the Niitsitapi $20,000 annually in goods and services in exchange for their moving onto a reservation.

In 1860, very few buffalo were left, and the Niitsitapi became completely dependent on government supplies. Often the food was spoiled by the time they received it, or supplies failed to arrive at all. Hungry and desperate, Blackfoot raided white settlements for food and supplies, and outlaws on both sides stirred up trouble.

Events were catalyzed by Owl Child, a young Piegan warrior who stole a herd of horses in 1867 from an American trader named Malcolm Clarke. Clarke retaliated by tracking Owl Child down and severely beating him in full view of Owl Child's camp, and humiliating him. According to Piegan oral history, Clarke had also raped Owl Child's wife. But, Clarke was long married to Coth-co-co-na, a Piegan woman who was Owl Child's cousin. The raped woman gave birth to a child as a result of the rape, which oral history said was stillborn or killed by band elders. Two years after the beating, in 1869 Owl Child and some associates killed Clarke at his ranch after dinner, and severely wounded his son Horace. Public outcry from news of the event led to General Philip Sheridan to dispatch a band of cavalry, led by Major Eugene Baker, to find Owl Child and his camp and punish them.

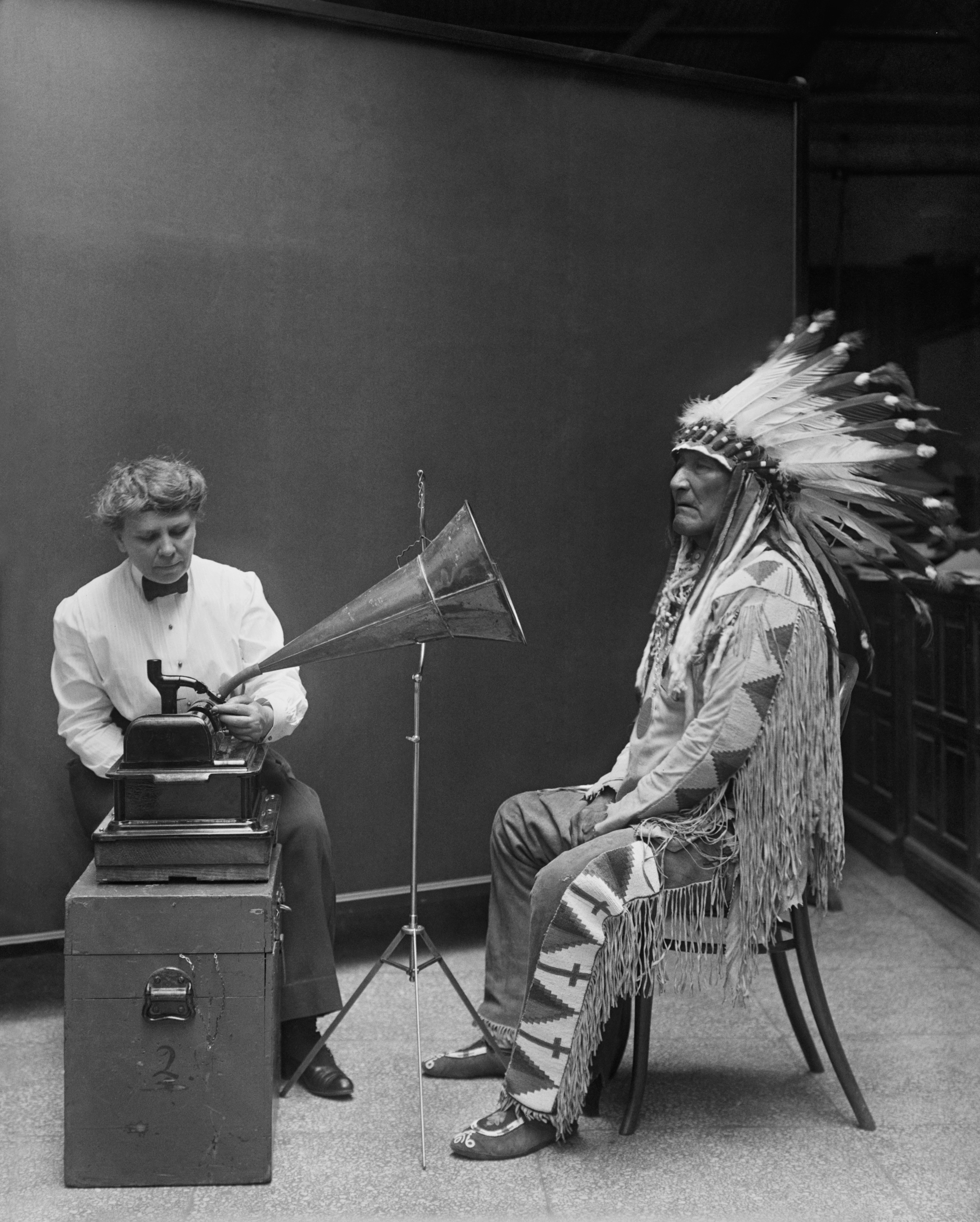
Frances Densmore plays a recording for chief Mountain Chief for the Bureau of American Ethnology in 1916.

On 23 January 1870, a camp of Piegan Indians were spotted by army scouts and reported to the dispatched cavalry, but it was mistakenly identified as a hostile band. Around 200 soldiers surrounded the camp the following morning and prepared for an ambush. Before the command to fire, the chief Heavy Runner was alerted to soldiers on the snowy bluffs above the encampment. He walked toward them, carrying his safe-conduct paper. Heavy Runner and his band of Piegans shared peace between American settlers and troops at the time of the event. Heavy Runner was shot and killed by army scout Joe Cobell, whose wife was part of the camp of the hostile Mountain Chief, further along the river, from whom he wanted to divert attention. Fellow scout Joe Kipp had realized the error and tried to signal the troops. He was threatened by the cavalry for reporting that the people they attacked were friendly.

Following the death of Heavy Runner, the soldiers attacked the camp. According to their count, they killed 173 Piegan and suffered just one U.S. Army soldier casualty, who fell off his horse and broke his leg, dying of complications. Most of the victims were women, children and the elderly, as most of the younger men were out hunting. The Army took 140 Piegan prisoner and then released them. With their camp and belongings destroyed, they suffered terribly from exposure, making their way as refugees to Fort Benton.

The greatest slaughter of Indians ever made by U.S. Troops

— Lieutenant Gus Doane, commander of F Company

As reports of the massacre gradually were learned in the east, members of the United States Congress and press were outraged. General William Tecumseh Sherman reported that most of the killed were warriors under Mountain Chief. An official investigation never occurred, and no official monument marks the spot of the massacre. Compared to events such as the massacres at Wounded Knee and Sand Creek, the Marias Massacre remains largely unknown. But, it confirmed President Ulysses S. Grant in his decision not to allow the Army to take over the Bureau of Indian Affairs, as it had been suggesting to combat corruption among Indian agents. Grant chose to appoint numerous Quakers to those positions as he pursued a peace policy with Native Americans.

The Cree and Assiniboine also suffered from the dwindling herds of the buffalo. By 1850 herds were found almost exclusively on the territory of the Blackfoot. Therefore, in 1870 various Nehiyaw-Pwat bands began a final effort to get hold of their prey, by beginning a war. They hoped to defeat the Blackfoot weakened by smallpox and attacked a camp near Fort Whoop-Up (called Akaisakoyi – "Many Dead"). But they were defeated in the so-called Battle of the Belly River (near Lethbridge, called Assini-etomochi – "where we slaughtered the Cree") and lost over 300 warriors. The next winter the hunger compelled them to negotiate with the Niitsitapi, with whom they made a final lasting peace.

The United States passed laws that adversely affected the Niitsitapi. In 1874, the US Congress voted to change the Niitsitapi reservation borders without discussing it with the Niitsitapi. They received no other land or compensation for the land lost, and in response, the Kainai, Siksika, and Piegan moved to Canada; only the Pikuni remained in Montana.

The winter of 1883–1884 became known as "Starvation Winter" because no government supplies came in, and the buffalo were gone. That winter, 600 Niitsitapi died of hunger.

In efforts to assimilate the Native Americans to European-American ways, in 1898, the government dismantled tribal governments and outlawed the practice of traditional Indian religions. They required Blackfoot children to go to boarding schools, where they were forbidden to speak their native language, practise customs, or wear traditional clothing. In 1907, the United States government adopted a policy of allotment of reservation land to individual heads of families to encourage family farming and break up the communal tribal lands. Each household received a 160-acre (65 ha) farm, and the government declared the remainder "surplus" to the tribe's needs. It put it up for sale for development. The allotments were too small to support farming on the arid plains. A 1919 drought destroyed crops and increased the cost of beef. Many Indians were forced to sell their allotted land and pay taxes which the government said they owed.

In 1934 the Indian Reorganization Act, passed by the Franklin D. Roosevelt administration, ended allotments and allowed the tribes to choose their own government. They were also allowed to practise their cultures. In 1935, the Blackfeet Nation of Montana began a Tribal Business Council. After that, they wrote and passed their own Constitution, with an elected representative government.

=== Re-establishment ===
In 2000, the Blackfoot Confederacy formally re-established itself and established a joint Blackfoot Confederacy Tribal Council.

== Culture ==
=== Electing a leader ===
Family was highly valued by the Blackfoot Indians. For traveling, they also split into bands of 20–30 people, but would come together for times of celebration. They valued leadership skills and chose the chiefs who would run their settlements wisely. During times of peace, the people would elect a peace chief, meaning someone who could lead the people and improve relations with other tribes. The title of war chief could not be gained through election and needed to be earned by successfully performing various acts of bravery including touching a living enemy. Blackfoot bands often had minor chiefs in addition to an appointed head chief.

=== Societies ===
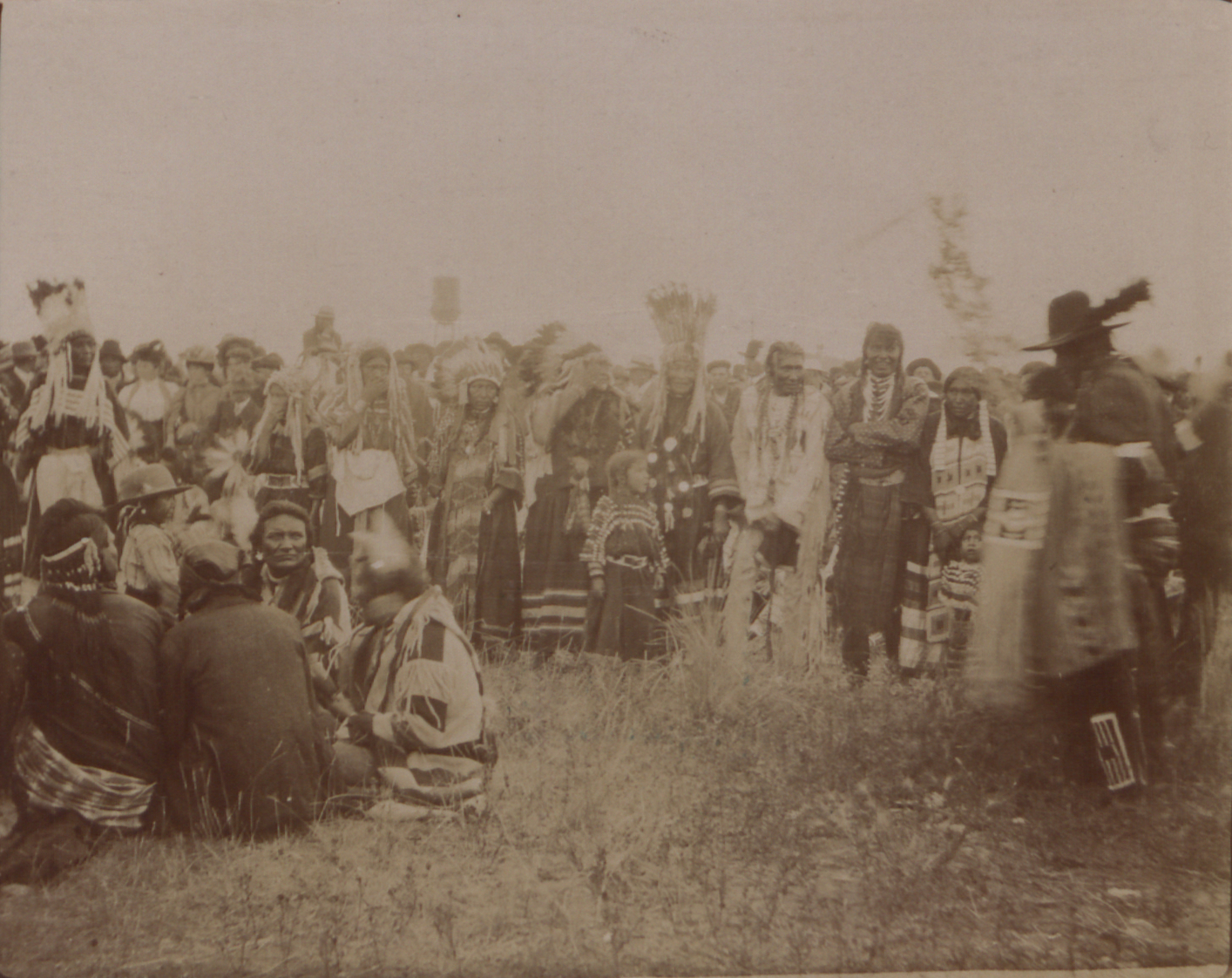
Scalp dance, Blackfoot Indians, 1907

Within the Blackfoot nation, there were different societies to which people belonged, each of which had functions for the tribe. Young people were invited into societies after proving themselves by recognized passages and rituals. For instance, young men had to perform a vision quest, begun by a spiritual cleansing in a sweat lodge. They went out from the camp alone for four days of fasting and praying. Their main goal was to see a vision that would explain their future. After having the vision, a youth returned to the village ready to join society.

In a warrior society, the men had to be prepared for battle. Again, the warriors would prepare by spiritual cleansing, then paint themselves symbolically; they often painted their horses for war as well. Leaders of the warrior society carried spears or lances called a coup stick, which was decorated with feathers, skin, and other tokens. They won prestige by "counting coup", tapping the enemy with the stick and getting away.

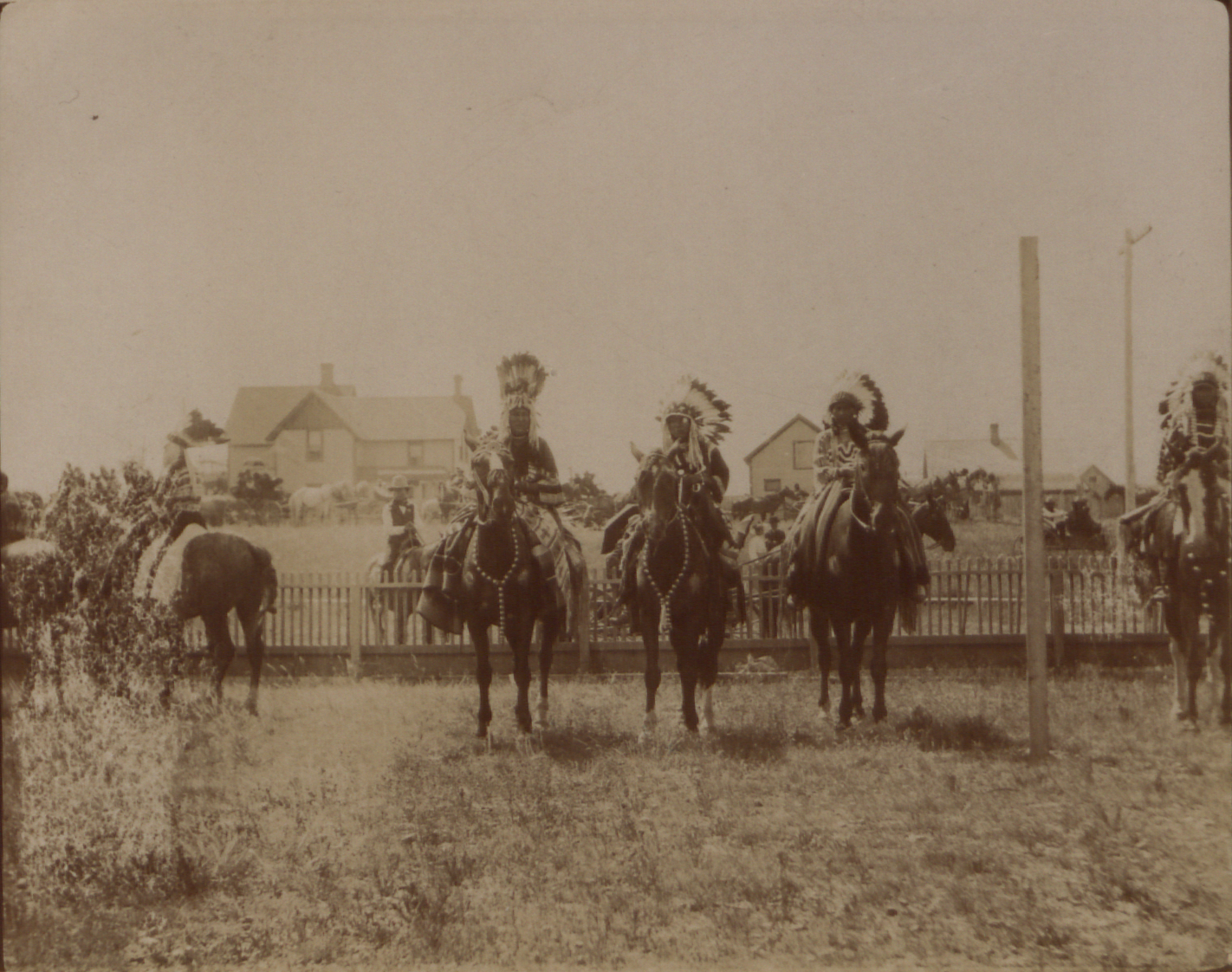
Women of the Blood Nation in battle dress, 1907

Members of the religious society protected sacred Blackfoot items and conducted religious ceremonies. They blessed the warriors before battle. Their major ceremony was the Sun Dance, or Medicine Lodge Ceremony. By engaging in the Sun Dance, their prayers would be carried up to the Creator, who would bless them with well-being and abundance of buffalo.

Women's societies also had important responsibilities for the communal tribe. They designed refined quillwork on clothing and ceremonial shields, helped prepare for battle, prepared skins and cloth to make clothing, cared for the children and taught them tribal ways, skinned and tanned the leathers used for clothing and other purposes, prepared fresh and dried foods, and performed ceremonies to help hunters in their journeys.

=== Ethnobotany ===
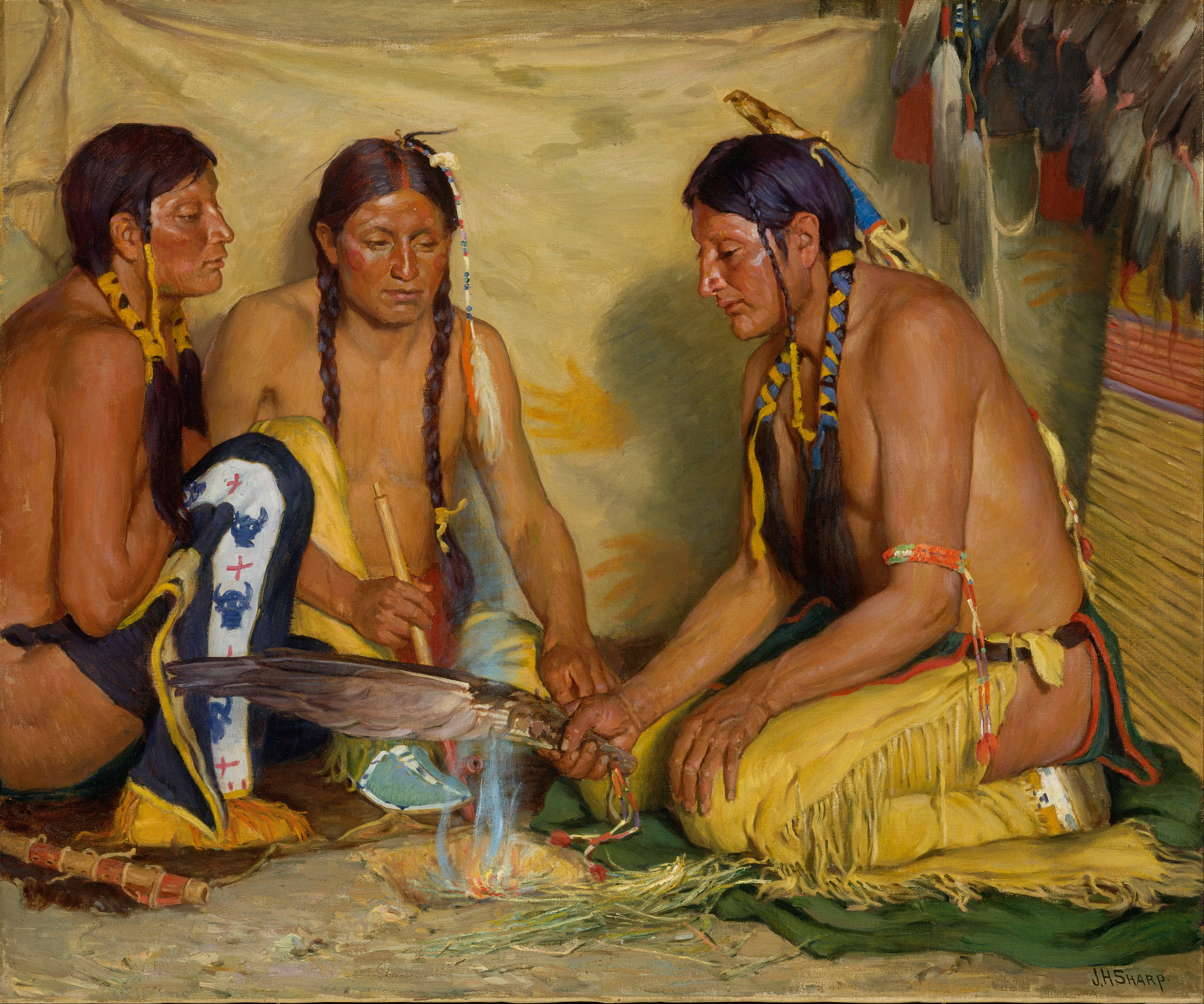
Blackfoot making sweet grass medicine for a ceremony.

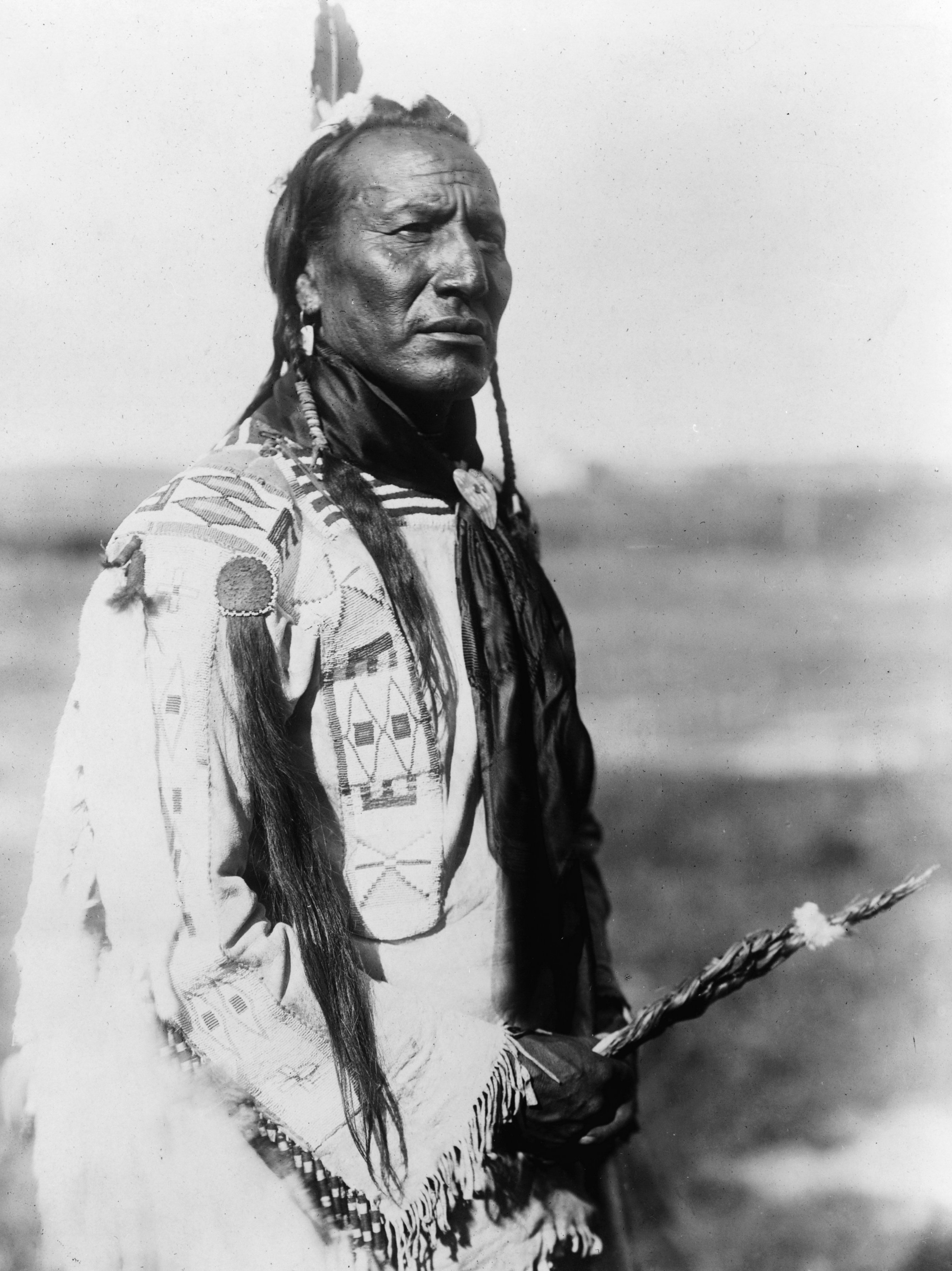
Blackfoot man with braided sweet grass ropes

Sage and sweet grass are both used by Blackfoot and other Plains tribes for ceremonial purposes and are considered sacred plants. Sage and sweet grass are burned with the user inhaling and covering themselves in the smoke in a process known widely as smudging. Sage is said to rid the body of negative emotions such as anger. Sweet grass is said to draw in positive energy. Both are used for purification purposes. The pleasant and natural odor of the burning grass is said to attract spirits. Sweet grass is prepared for ceremony by braiding the stems together then drying them before burning.

Sweet grass is also often present and burned in pipe-smoking mixtures alongside bearberry and red willow plants. The smoke from the pipe is said to carry the user's prayers up to the Creator with the rising smoke. Large medicine bags often decorated with ornate beaded designs were used by medicine men to carry sage, sweet grass, and other important plants. Blackfoot also used sweet grass smoke, or sachets of sweet grass in their clothing, as an effective insect repellent.

A poultice of the chewed roots of Asclepias viridiflora is applied to swellings, to "diarrhea rash", to rashes, to the sore gums of nursing infants, and to sore eyes. The root of A. viridiflora can be chewed to soothe sore throats, eaten as food, and the plant can be used to spice soups. An infusion of the roots and leaves of Viola adunca is applied to sore and swollen joints, given to asthmatic children, and the plant can be used to dye arrows blue. Carex is used in moccasins to protect the feet during winter horse-stealing expeditions.

=== Marriage ===
In the Blackfoot culture, men were responsible for choosing their marriage partners, but women had the choice to accept them or not. The male had to show the woman's father his skills as a hunter or warrior. If the father was impressed and approved of the marriage, the man and woman would exchange gifts of horses and clothing and were considered married. The married couple would reside in their own tipi or with the husband's family. Although the man was permitted more than one wife, typically he only chose one. In cases of more than one wife, quite often the male would choose a sister of the wife, believing that sisters would not argue as much as total strangers.

=== Responsibilities and clothing ===
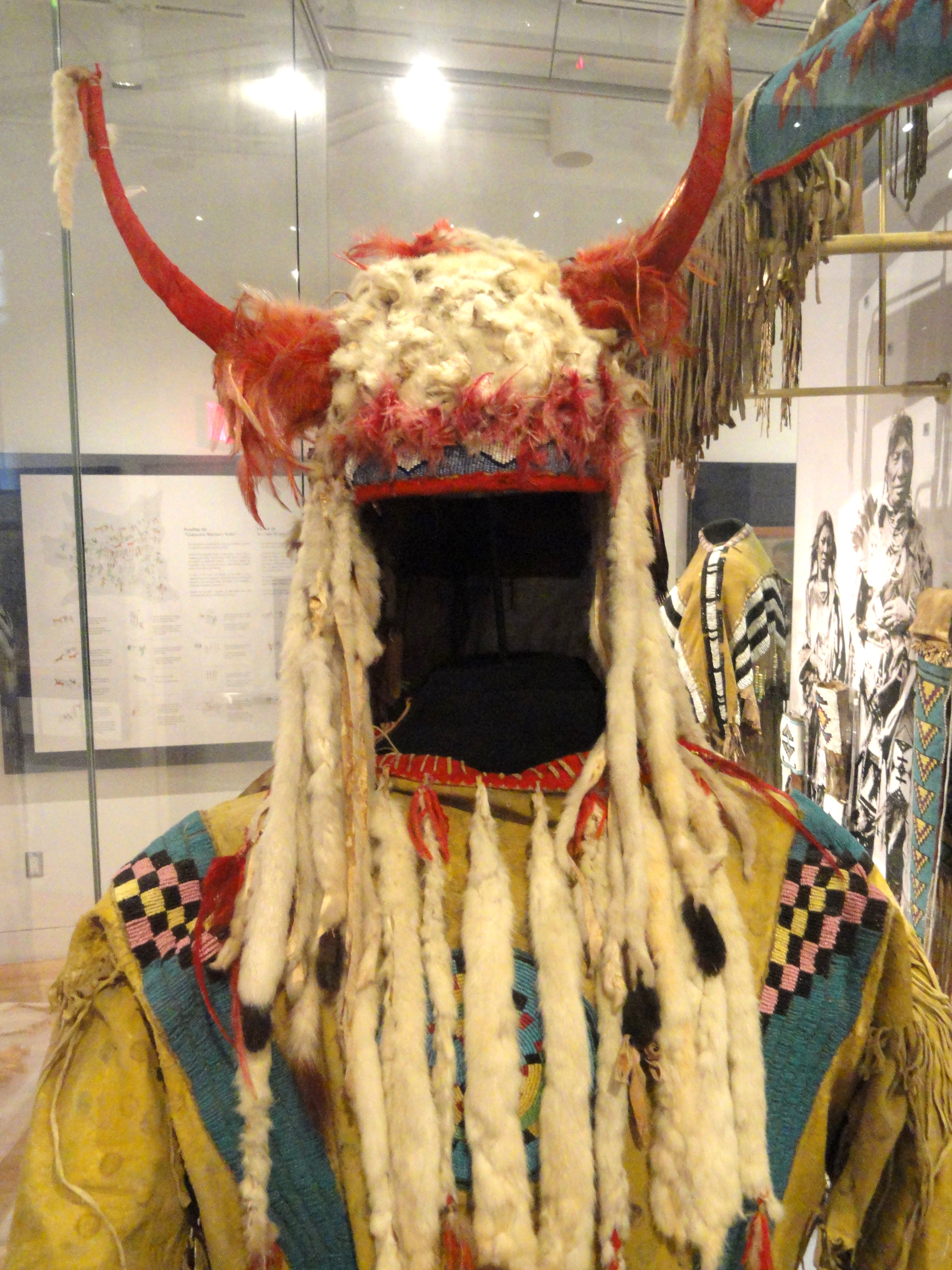
Horned bonnet with ermine skin.

In a typical Blackfoot family, the father would go out and hunt and bring back supplies that the family might need. The mother would stay close to home and watch over the children while the father was out. The children were taught basic survival skills and culture as they grew up. It was generally said that both boys and girls learned to ride horses early. Boys would usually play with toy bows and arrows until they were old enough to learn how to hunt.

They would also play a popular game called shinny, which later became known as ice hockey. They used a long curved wooden stick to knock a ball, made of baked clay covered with buckskin, over a goal line. Girls were given a doll to play with, which also doubled as a learning tool because it was fashioned with typical tribal clothing and designs and also taught the young women how to care for a child. As they grew older, more responsibilities were placed upon their shoulders. The girls were then taught to cook, prepare hides for leather, and gather wild plants and berries. The boys were held accountable for going out with their father to prepare food by means of hunting.

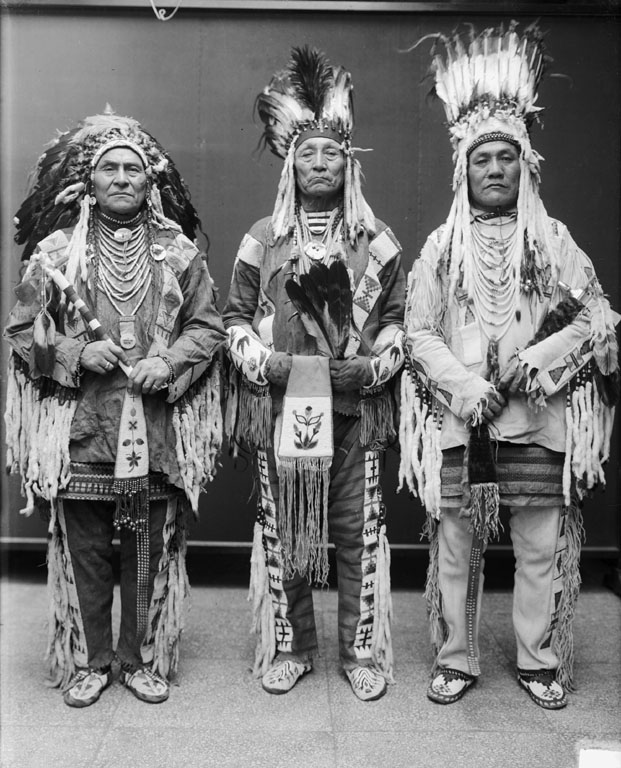

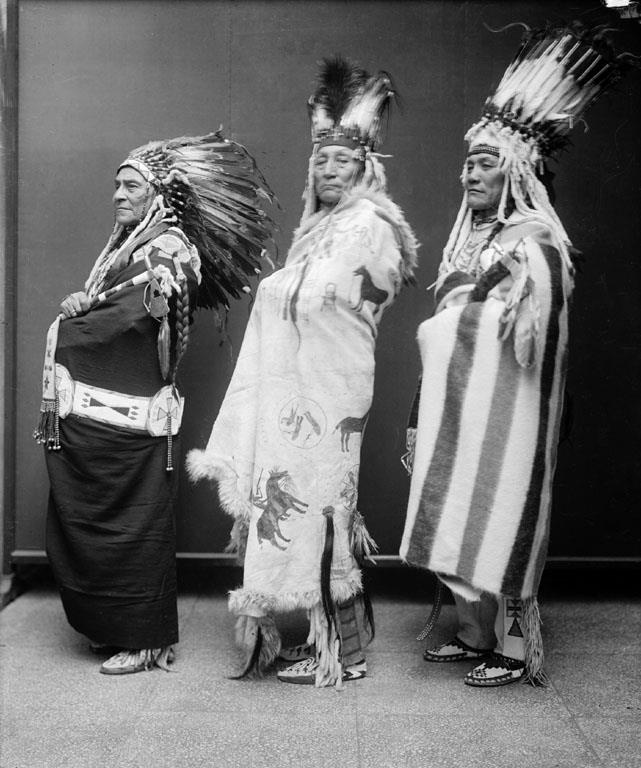
Three Piegan Blackfoot men in traditional clothing including straight-up and standard war bonnets.

Typically clothing was made primarily of softened and tanned antelope and deer hides. The women would make and decorate the clothes for everyone in the tribe. Men wore moccasins, long leggings that went up to their hips, a loincloth, and a belt. Occasionally they would wear shirts but generally they would wrap buffalo robes around their shoulders. The distinguished men of bravery would wear a necklace made of grizzly bear claws.

Boys dressed much like the older males, wearing leggings, loincloths, moccasins, and occasionally an undecorated shirt. They kept warm by wearing a buffalo robe over their shoulders or over their heads if it became cold. Women and girls wore dresses made from two or three deerskins. The women wore decorative earrings and bracelets made from sea shells, obtained through trade with distant tribes, or different types of metal. They would sometimes wear beads in their hair or paint the part in their hair red, which signified that they were old enough to bear children.

=== Headdresses ===
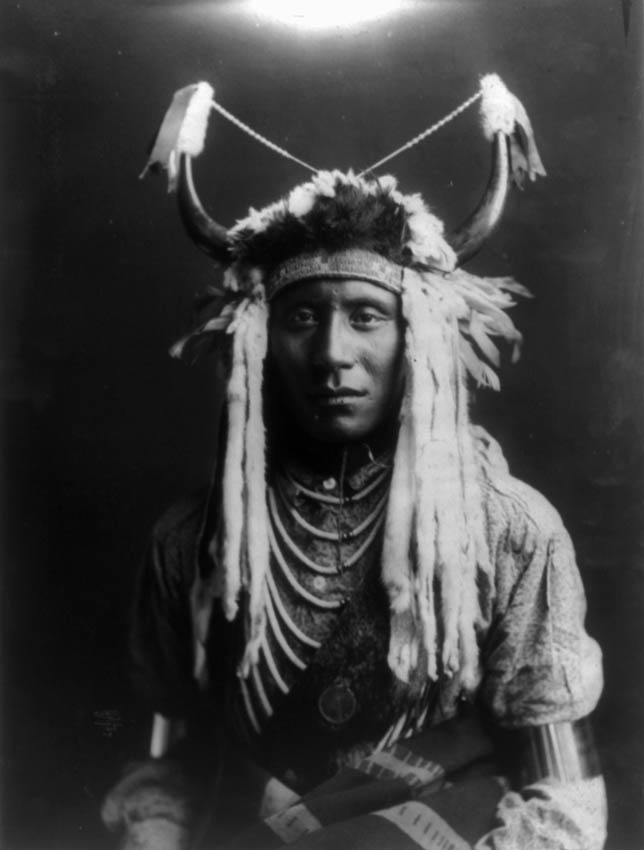
Head Carry, a Piegan man wearing a split horn headdress. Photographed by Edward S. Curtis, 1900.

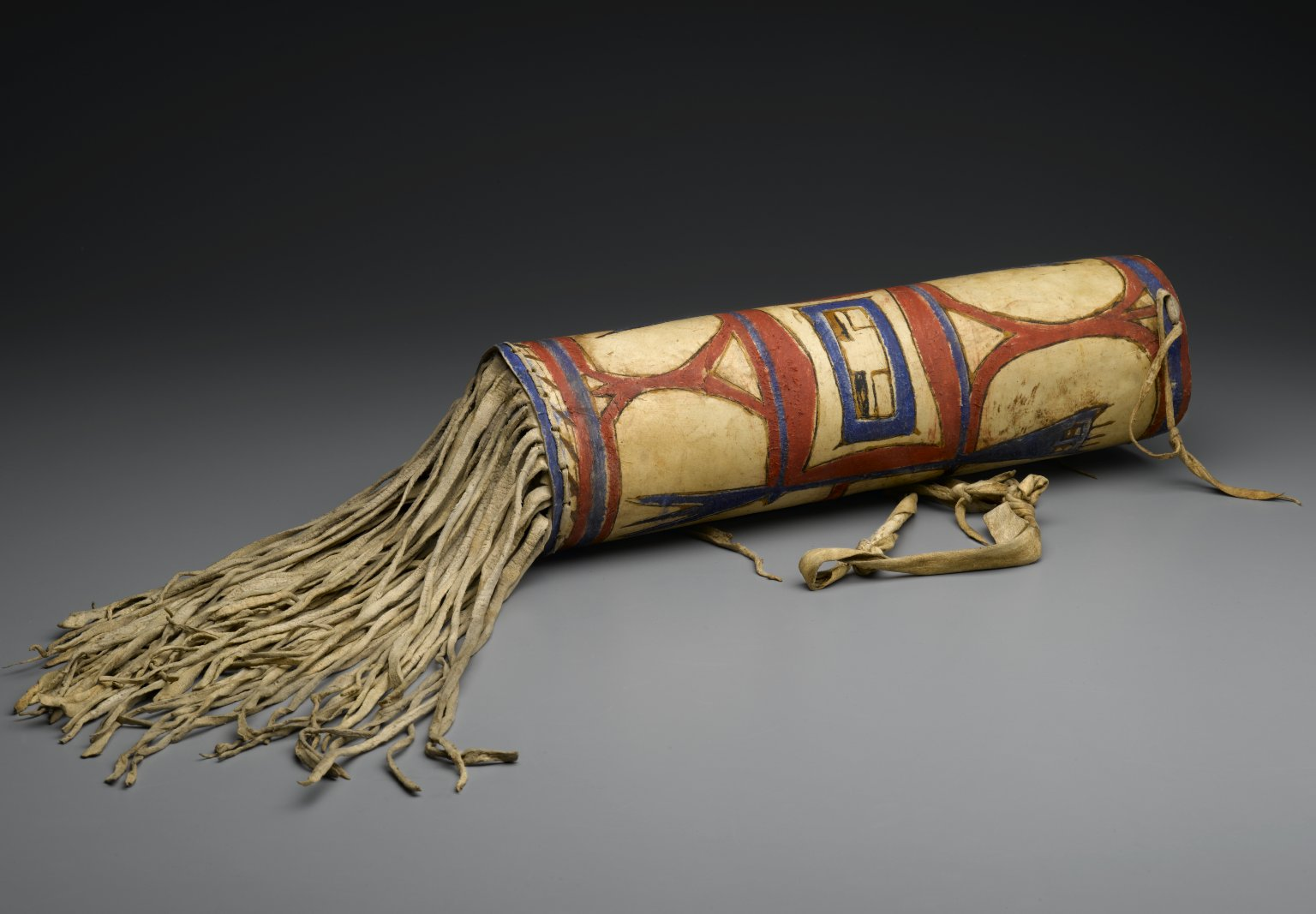
Headdress Case, Blackfoot (Native American), late 19th century, Brooklyn Museum

Similar to other Indigenous Peoples of the Great Plains, the Blackfoot developed a variety of different headdresses that incorporated elements of creatures important to them; these served different purposes and symbolized different associations. The typical war bonnet was made from eagle feathers, because the bird was considered powerful. It was worn by prestigious warriors and chiefs (including war-chiefs) of the Blackfoot. The straight-up headdress is a uniquely Blackfoot headdress that, like the war bonnet, is made with eagle feathers. The feathers on the straight-up headdress point directly straight upwards from the rim (hence the name). Often a red plume is attached to the front of the headdress; it also points straight upward.

The split-horn headdress was very popular among Northern Plains Indians, particularly those nations of the Blackfoot Confederacy. Many warrior societies, including the Horn Society of the Blackfoot, wore the split-horn headdress. The split-horn headdress was made from a single bison horn, split in two and reshaped as slimmer versions of a full-sized bison horn, and polished. The horns were attached to a beaded, rimmed felt hat. Furs from weasels (taken when carrying heavy winter coats) were attached to the top of the headdress, and dangled from the sides. The side furs were often finished with bead work where attached to the headdress. A similar headdress, called the antelope horn headdress, was made in a similar fashion using the horn or horns from a pronghorn antelope.

Blackfoot men, particularly warriors, sometimes wore a roach made from porcupine hair. The hairs of the porcupine are most often dyed red. Eagle and other bird feathers were occasionally attached to the roach.

Buffalo scalps, often with horns still attached and often with a beaded rim, were also worn. Fur "turbans" made from soft animal fur (most often otter) were also popular. Buffalo scalps and fur turbans were worn in the winter to protect the head from the cold.

The Blackfoot have continued to wear traditional headdresses at special ceremonies. They are worn mostly by elected chiefs, members of various traditional societies (including the Horn, Crazy Dog and Motokik societies), powwow dancers and spiritual leaders.

=== Sun and the Moon ===
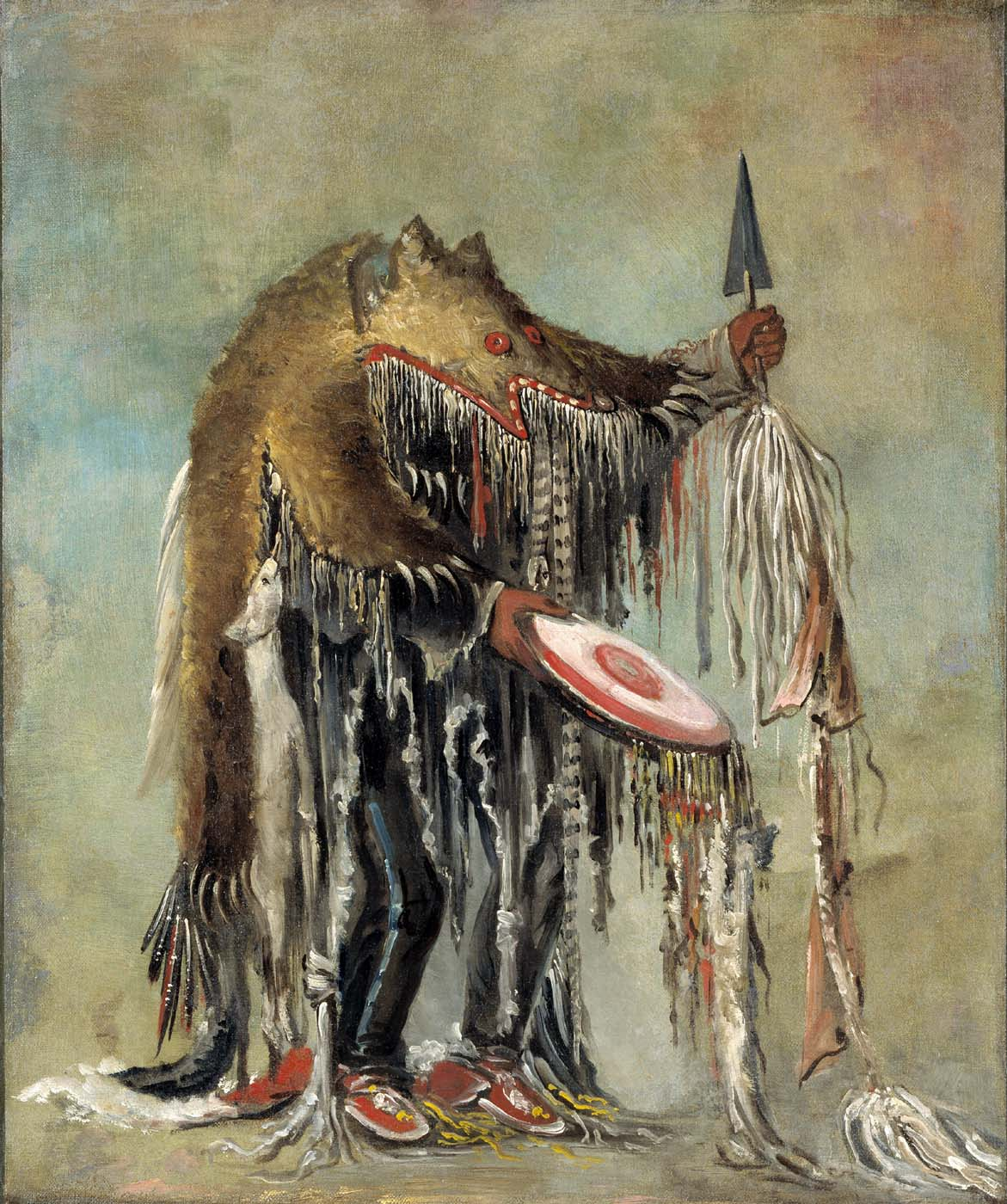
A Siksika Blackfeet Medicine Man, painted by George Catlin.

One of the most famous traditions held by the Blackfoot is their story of sun and the moon. It starts with a family of a man, wife, and two sons, who live off berries and other food they can gather, as they have no bows and arrows, or other tools (albeit a stone axe). One night, the man had a dream: he was told by the dream to get a large spider web and put it on the trail where the animals roamed, and they would get caught up and could be easily killed with the stone axe he had. The man had done so and saw that it was true. One day, he came home from bringing in some fresh meat from the trail and discovered his wife to be applying perfume on herself. He thought that she must have another lover since she never did this before. He then told his wife that he was going to move a web and asked if she could bring in the meat and wood he had left outside from a previous hunt. She had reluctantly gone out and passed over a hill. The wife looked back three times and saw her husband in the same place she had left him, so she continued on to retrieve the meat. The father then asked his children if they went with their mother to find wood, but they never had. However they knew the location in which she retrieved it from.

The man set out and found the timber along with a den of rattlesnakes, one of which was his wife's lover. He set the timber on fire and killed the snakes. He knew by doing this that his wife would become enraged, so the man returned home. He told the children to flee and gave them a stick, stone, and moss to use if their mother chased after them. He remained at the house and put a web over his front door. The wife tried to get in but became stuck and had her leg cut off. She then put her head through and he cut that off also. While the body followed the husband to the creek, the head followed the children. The oldest boy saw the head behind them and threw the stick. The stick turned into a great forest. The head made it through, so the younger brother instructed the elder to throw the stone. He did so, and where the stone landed a huge mountain popped up. It spanned from big water (ocean) to big water and the head was forced to go through it, not around. The head met a group of rams and said to them she would marry their chief if they butted their way through the mountain. The chief agreed and they butted until their horns were worn down, but this still was not through. She then asked the ants if they could burrow through the mountain with the same stipulations, it was agreed and they get her the rest of the way through. The children were far ahead, but eventually saw the head rolling behind them. The boys wet the moss and wrung it out behind themselves. They were then in a different land surrounded by an expanse of water (the 'new land' is commonly interpreted as Russia, with the expanse of water being the Bering Strait). The head rolled into the water and drowned. The children decided to build a raft and head back. Once they returned to their land, however, they discovered that it was now occupied by the Crow people and the Snake people, so they decided to split up.

One brother was simple and went north to discover what he could and make people. The other was smart and went south to make white people. He taught them how to forge and make advanced weapons, which is how the Blackfoot people believe the whites became so technologically advanced. The simple brother created the Blackfoot nation and was unable to teach them anything. He became known as Left Hand, and later by the Blackfoot as Old Man (or Napiw, the Creator). The woman still chases the man: she is the moon and he is the sun, and if she ever catches him, it will always be night.

=== Blackfoot creation story ===
The creation myth is part of the oral history of the Blackfoot nation. It was said that in the beginning, Napi floated on a log with four animals. The animals were: Mamíí (fish), Matsiyíkkapisaa (frog), Naamsskíí (lizard), and Sspopíi (turtle). Napi sent all of them into the deep water, one after another. The first three had gone down and returned with nothing. The turtle went down and retrieved mud from the bottom and gave it to Napi.

He took the mud and rolled it in his hand and created the earth. He let it roll out of his hand and over time, it has grown to what it is today. After he created the earth, he created women first, followed by men. He had them living separately from one another. The men were shy and afraid, but Napi said to them to not fear and take one as their wife. They had done as he asked, and Napi continued to create the buffalo and bows and arrows for the people so that they could hunt them.

== People ==
Blackfoot, Niitsítapi, Siksikáí'tsitapi ᖹᒧᐧᒣᑯ
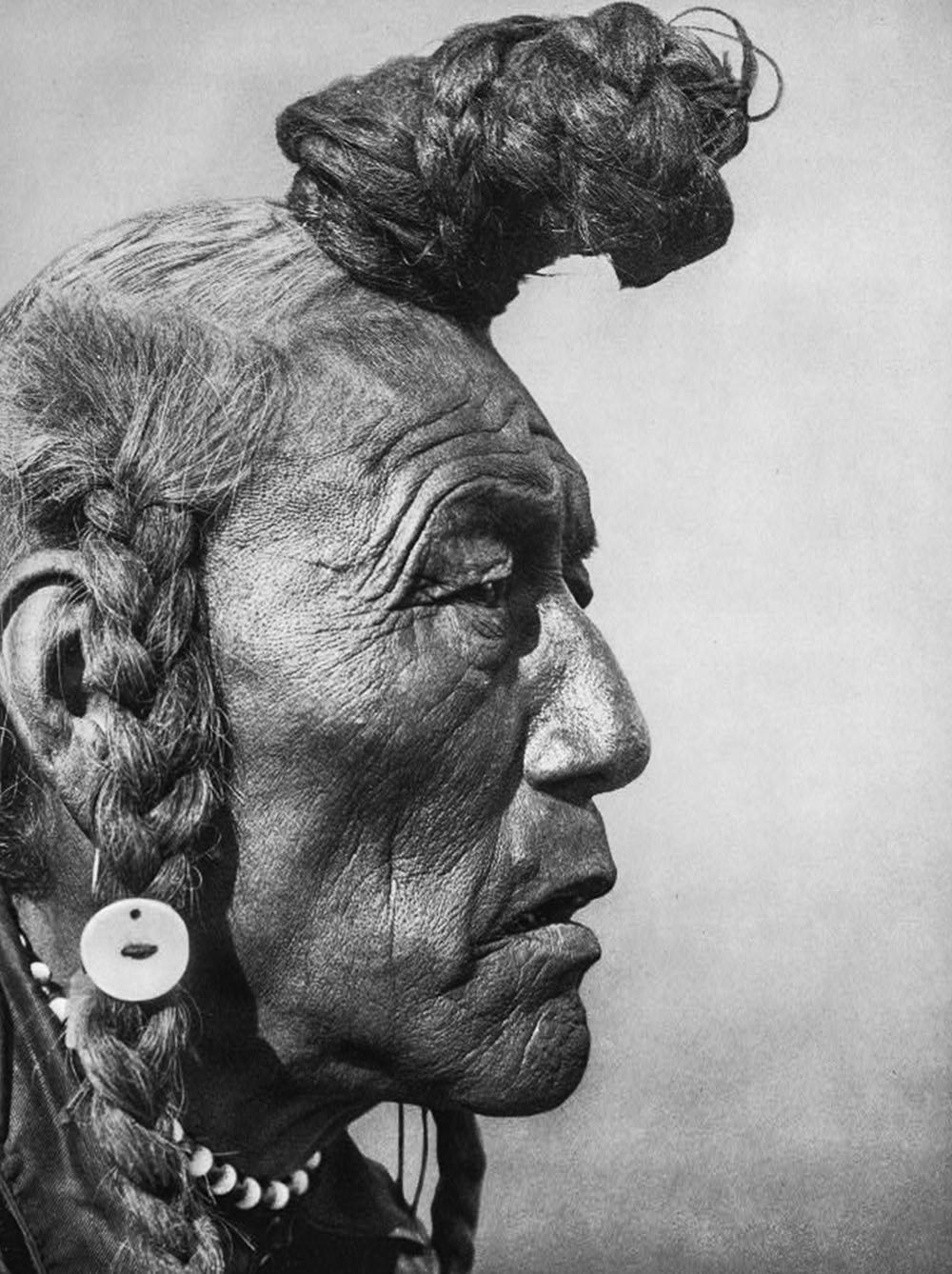
- Bear Bull, Blackfoot translator photographed by Edward S. Curtis (1926)

Total population
- 32,000

Regions with significant populations
- Canada ( Saskatchewan, Alberta, British Columbia (part)) United States ( Montana, Wyoming (part) Idaho)

Languages
- English, Blackfoot

Religion
- Traditional beliefs, Sun Dance, Christianity

Related ethnic groups
- Algonquian peoples

=== Ethnic divisions ===
The largest ethnic group in the Confederacy is the Piegan, also spelled Peigan or Pikuni. Their name derives from the Blackfoot term Piikáni. They are divided into the Piikani Nation (Aapátohsipikáni ("the companion up there") or simply Piikáni) in present-day Alberta, and the South Peigan or Piegan Blackfeet (Aamsskáápipikani) in Montana, United States. A once large and mighty division of the Piegan were the I'náksiyiiksi ("the humans" or "Small Robes") of southwestern Montana. Today they survive only as a clan or band of the South Peigan.

The modern Kainai Nation is named for the Blackfoot-language term Káínaa, meaning "Many Chief people". These were historically also called the "Blood," from a Plains Cree name for the Kainai: Miko-Ew, meaning "stained with blood" (i.e. "the bloodthirsty, cruel"). The common English name for the tribe is Blood or the Blood tribe.

The Siksika Nation's name derives from Siksikáwa, meaning "Those of like" or "Blackfoot". The Siksika also call themselves Sao-kitapiiksi, meaning "Plains People".

The Sarcee call themselves the Tsu T'ina, meaning "a great number of people." During early years of conflict, the Blackfoot called them Saahsi or Sarsi, "the stubborn ones", in their language. The Sarcee are from an entirely different language family; they are part of the Athabascan or Dené language family, most of whose members are located in the Subarctic of Northern Canada. Specifically, the Sarcee are an offshoot of the Beaver (Danezaa) people, who migrated south onto the plains sometime in the early eighteenth century. They later joined the Confederacy and essentially merged with the Pikuni ("Once had").

The Gros Ventre people call themselves the Haaninin ("white clay people"), also spelled A'aninin. The French called them Gros Ventres ("fat bellies"), misinterpreting a physical sign for waterfall; and the English called them the Fall Indians, related to waterfalls in the mountains. The Blackfoot referred to them as the Piik-siik-sii-naa ("snakes") or Atsina ("like a Cree"), because of years of enmity. Early scholars thought the A'aninin were related to the Arapaho Nation, who inhabited the Missouri Plains and moved west to Colorado and Wyoming. They were allied with the Confederacy from circa 1793 to 1861, but came to disagreement and were enemies of it thereafter.

=== Modern communities ===
==== Economy and services ====
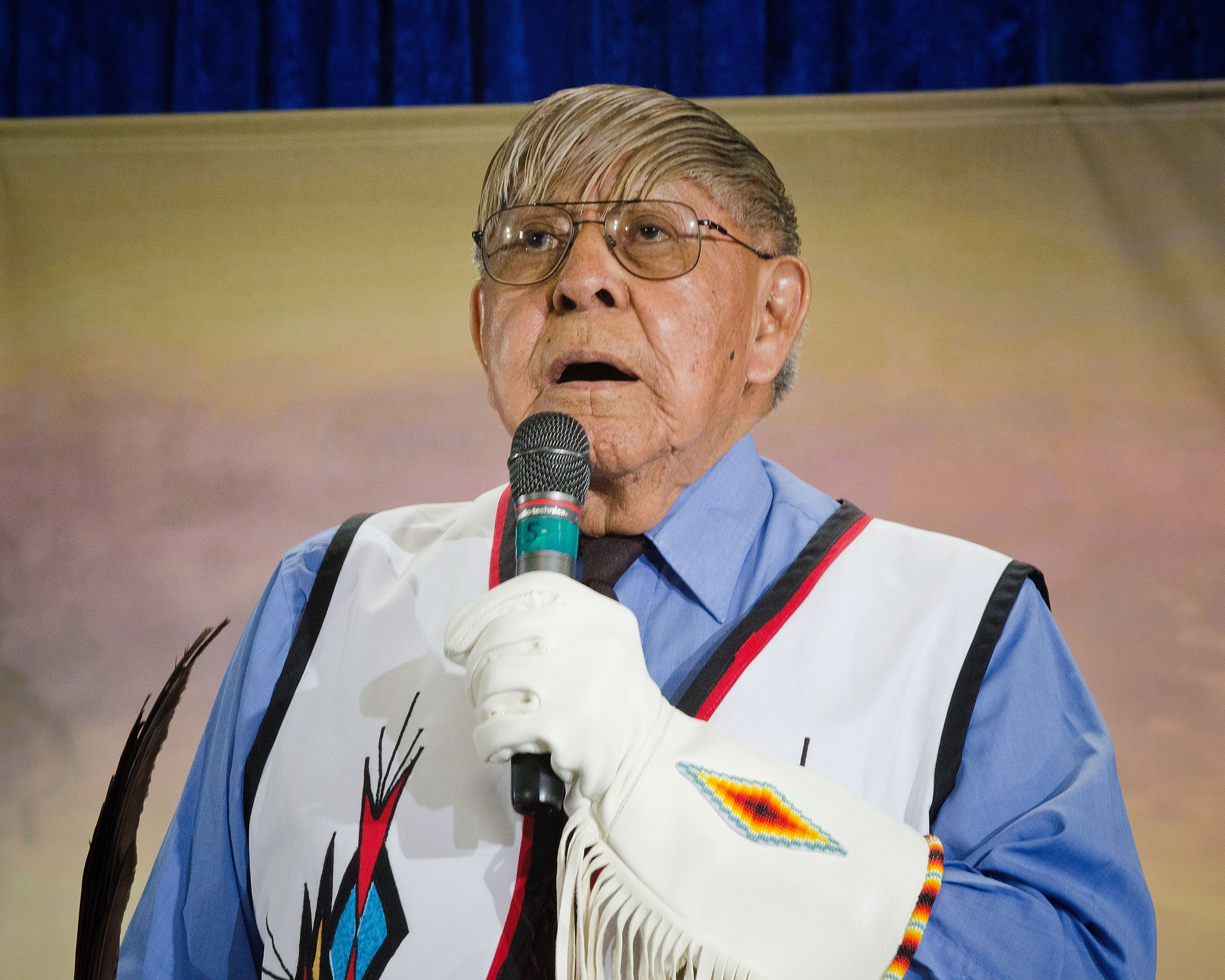
Earl Old Person, honorary chief of the Blackfoot.

Today, many of the Blackfoot live on reserves in Canada. About 8,500 live on the Montana reservation of 1,500,000 acres (6,100 km^{2}). In 1896, the Blackfoot sold a large portion of their land to the United States government, which hoped to find gold or copper deposits. No such mineral deposits were found. In 1910, the land was set aside as Glacier National Park. Some Blackfoot work there and occasional Native American ceremonies are held there.

Unemployment is a challenging problem on the Blackfeet Reservation and on Canadian Blackfoot reserves, because of their isolation from major urban areas. Many people work as farmers, but there are not enough other jobs nearby. To find work, many Blackfoot have relocated from the reservation to towns and cities. Some companies pay the Blackfoot governments to lease use of lands for extracting oil, natural gas, and other resources. The nations have operated such businesses such as the Blackfoot Writing Company, a pen and pencil factory, which opened in 1972, but it closed in the late 1990s. In Canada, the Northern Piegan make traditional craft clothing and moccasins, and the Kainai operate a shopping center and factory.

In 1974, the Blackfoot Community College, a tribal college, opened in Browning, Montana. The school is also the location of the tribal headquarters. As of 1979, the Montana state government requires all public school teachers on or near the reservation to have a background in American Indian studies.

In 1986, the Kainai Nation opened the Red Crow Community College in Stand Off, Alberta. In 1989, the Siksika tribe in Canada completed the construction of a high school to go along with its elementary school.

==== Traditional culture ====
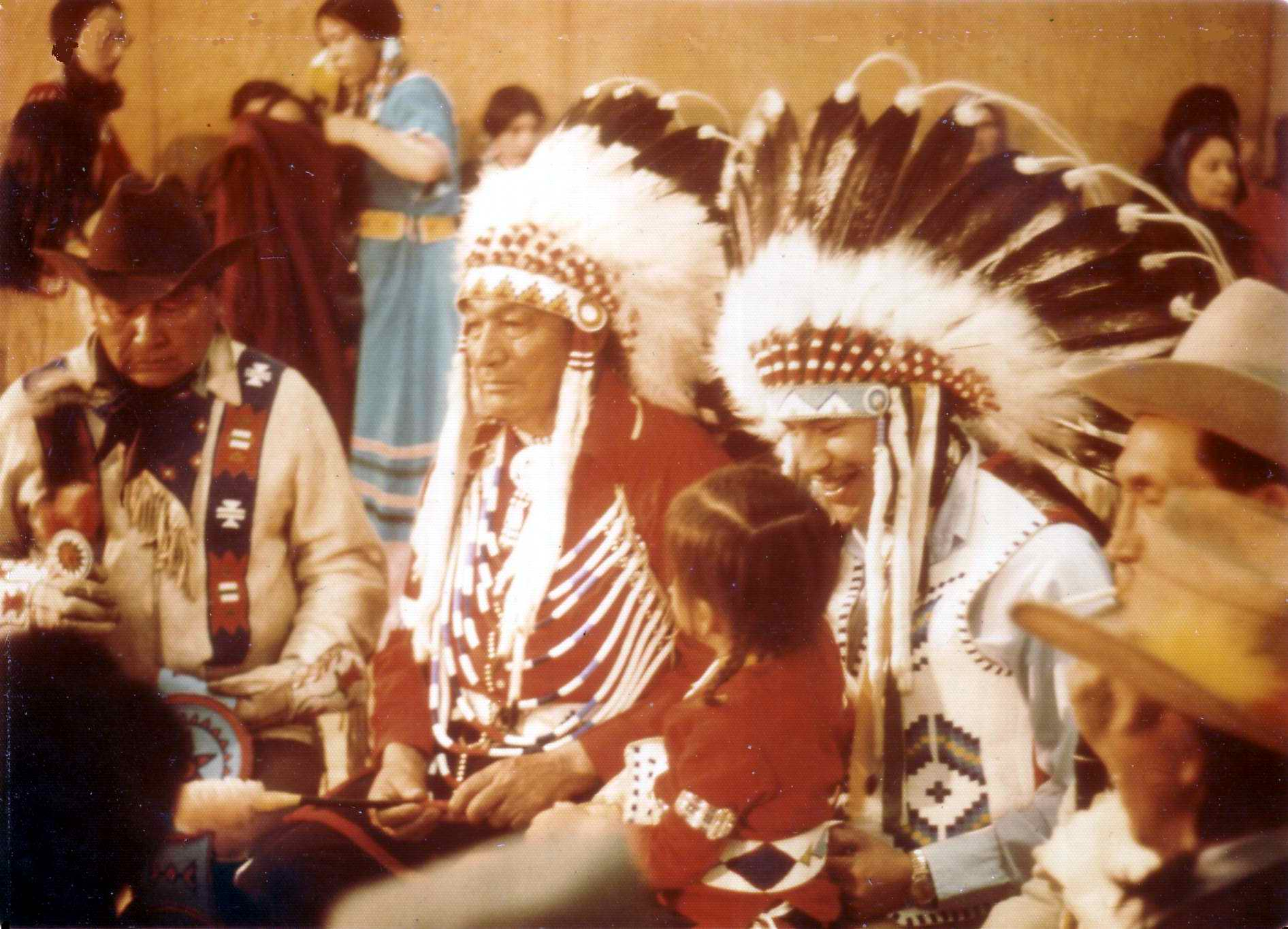
Blackfoot gathering, Alberta. 1973

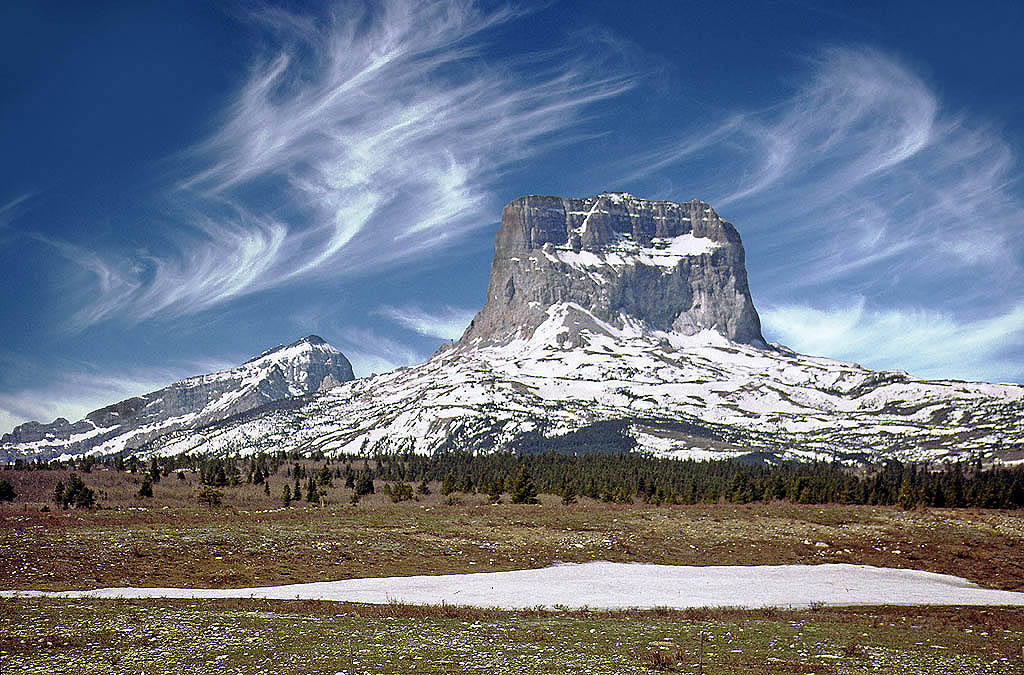
Chief Mountain is sacred to the Blackfoot. The mountain marks the boundary between the Blackfoot reservation in Montana and Glacier National Park.

The Blackfoot continue many cultural traditions of the past and hope to extend their ancestors' traditions to their children. They want to teach their children the Pikuni language as well as other traditional knowledge. In the early 20th century, a white woman named Frances Densmore helped the Blackfoot record their language. During the 1950s and 1960s, few Blackfoot spoke the Pikuni language. In order to save their language, the Blackfoot Council asked elders who still knew the language to teach it. The elders had agreed and succeeded in reviving the language, so today the children can learn Pikuni at school or at home. In 1994, the Blackfoot Council accepted Pikuni as the official language.

The people have revived the Black Lodge Society, responsible for protecting songs and dances of the Blackfoot. They continue to announce the coming of spring by opening five medicine bundles, one at every sound of thunder during the spring. One of the biggest celebrations is called the North American Indian Days. Lasting four days, it is held during the second week of July in Browning. Lastly, the Sun Dance, which was illegal from the 1890s–1934, has been practiced again for years. While it was illegal, the Blackfoot held it in secret. Since 1934, they have practised it every summer. The event lasts eight days – time filled with prayers, dancing, singing, and offerings to honor the Creator. It provides an opportunity for the Blackfoot to get together and share views and ideas with each other, while celebrating their culture's most sacred ceremonies.

The Blackfeet Nation in Montana have a blue tribal flag. The flag shows a ceremonial lance or coup stick with 29 feathers. The center of the flag contains a ring of 32 white and black eagle feathers. Within the ring is an outline map of the Blackfoot Reservation. Within the map is depicted a warrior's headdress and the words "Blackfeet Nation" and "Pikuni" (the name of the tribe in the Algonquian native tongue of the Blackfoot).

== Notable Blackfoot people ==
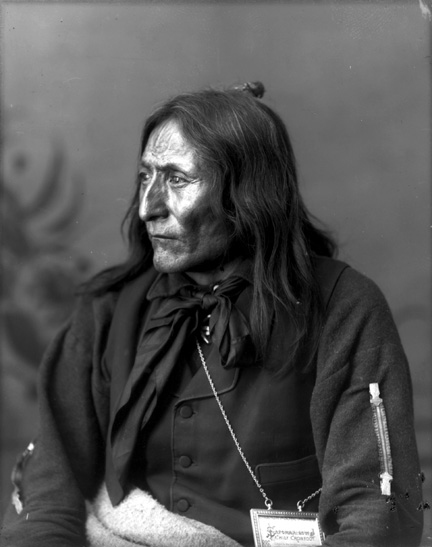
Chief Crowfoot.

- Eugene Brave Rock, actor, stuntman, and activist
- Elouise Cobell, banker and activist who led the 20th-century lawsuit that forced the US Government to reform individual Indian trusts
- Byron Chief-Moon, performer and choreographer
- Crowfoot (ISAPO-MUXIKA – "Crow Indian's Big Foot", also known in French as Pied de Corbeau), Chief of the Big Pipes band (later renamed Moccasin band, a splinter band of the Biters band), Head Chief of the South Siksika, by 1870 one of three Head Chiefs of the Siksika or the Blackfoot proper
- Aatsista-Mahkan ("Running Rabbit", * about 1833 – d. January 1911), since 1871 Chief of the Biters band (Ai-sik'-stuk-iks) of the Siksika, signed Treaty No.7 in 1877, along with Crowfoot, Old Sun, Red Crow, and other leaders
- A-ca-oo-mah-ca-ye (Ac ko mok ki, Ak ko mock ki, A'kow-muk-ai – "Feathers", since he took the name Old Swan), since about 1820 Chief of the Old Feathers' band, his personal following was known as the Bad Guns band, consisted of about 400 persons, along with Old Sun and Three Suns (No-okskatos) one of three Head Chiefs of the Siksika
- Stu-mick-o-súcks ("Buffalo Bull's Back Fat"), Head Chief of the Kainai, had his portrait painted at Fort Union in 1832
- Faye HeavyShield, Kainai sculptor and installation artist
- Joe Hipp, Heavyweight boxer, the first Native American to compete for the WBA World Heavyweight Title.
- Beverly Hungry Wolf, author
- Stephen Graham Jones, author
- Earl Old Person (Cold Wind or Changing Home), Blackfoot tribal chairman from 1964 to 2008 and honorary lifetime chief of the Blackfoot
- Jerry Potts (1840–1896), (also known as Ky-yo-kosi – "Bear Child"), was a Canadian-American plainsman, buffalo hunter, horse trader, interpreter, and scout of Kainai-Scottish descent. He identified as Piegan and became a minor Kainai chief.
- Steve Reevis, actor who appeared in Fargo, Dances with Wolves, Last of the Dogmen, Comanche Moon and many other films and TV.
- Misty Upham (1982–2014), actress
- James Welch (1940–2003), Blackfoot-Gros Ventre author
- The Honourable Eugene Creighton, judge of the Provincial Court of Alberta.
- Gyasi Ross, author, attorney, musician and political activist.
- Lily Gladstone, actress, who is part Blackfoot and Nez Perce
- Sinakson Trevor Solway, filmmaker

== Representation in other media ==
- Hergé's Tintin in America (1932) featured Blackfoot people.
- Jimmy P (2013) is a Franco-American film exploring the psychoanalysis of a Blackfoot, Jimmy Picard, in the post-World War II period at a veterans' hospital by a Hungarian-French ethnologist and psychoanalyst, George Devereux. The screenplay was adapted from his book about this process, published in 1951.

== See also ==
- Blackfeet music
- Blackfoot language
- Buffalo Treaty
- List of Native American peoples in the United States
- Palliser Region
