= Buffalo Bull's Back Fat =

Chief of Siksika First Nation

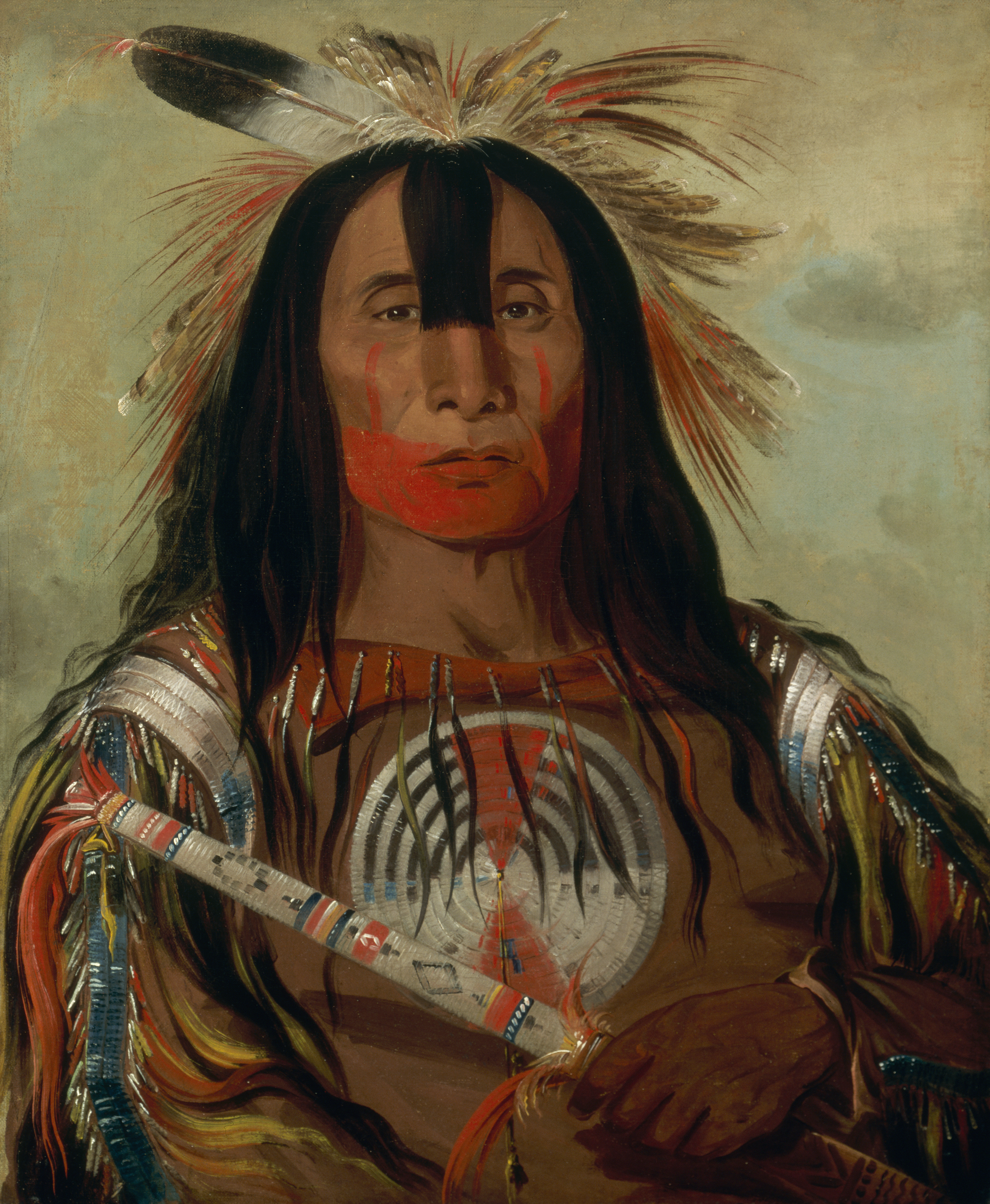
Portrait by George Catlin

Buffalo Bull's Back Fat, or Stu-mick-o-súcks (Blackfoot: ᔈᒣᒍᖾᓭᖽᐧ, romanized: Stamikosáksi), was a head war chief of the Kainai Nation. He is remembered today for his portrait, painted by George Catlin in 1832, located at the Smithsonian American Art Museum.

In one of his letters, Catlin wrote:

I have this day been painting a portrait of the head chief of the [Blood tribe] ... he is a good-looking and dignified Indian, about fifty years of age, and superbly dressed; whilst sitting for his picture he has been surrounded by his own braves and warriors and also gazed at by his enemies, the Crows and the Knisteneaux, Assinneboins and Ojibbeways; a number of distinguished personages of each of which tribes have laid all day around the sides of my room; reciting to each other the battles they have fought, and pointing to the scalp-locks, worn as proofs of their victories, and attached to the seams of their shirts and leggings. The name of this dignitary of whom I have just spoken is Stu-mick-o-sucks (the buffalo's back fat), i.e., the 'hump' or 'fleece' the most delicious part of the buffalo's flesh. ... The dress ... of the chief ... consists of a shirt or tunic, made of two deerskins finely dressed, and so placed together with the necks of the skins downwards, and the skins of the hind legs stitched together, the seams running down on each arm, from the neck to the knuckles of the hand; this seam is covered with a band of two inches in width, of very beautiful embroidery of porcupine quills, and suspended from the under edge of this, from the shoulders to the hands, is a fringe of the locks of black hair, which he has taken from the heads of victims slain by his own hand in battle. ... In his hand he holds a very beautiful pipe, the stem of which is four or five feet long, and two inches wide, curiously wound with braids of the porcupine quills of various colours; and the bowl of the pipe ingeniously carved by himself from a piece of red steatite of an interesting character, and which they all tell me is procured somewhere between this place and the Falls of St. Anthony, on the head waters of the Mississippi.

— George Catlin, Letters and Notes, vol. 1, pp. 29–31

The painting appeared in the exhibit Pictures from the New World at Schloss Charlottenburg, which was held in the Orangerie of Charlottenburg Palace, Berlin, Germany, in 1989.
