= Cut Bank =

A cut bank is an outside bank of a river that is continually being undercut. It also may refer to:

- Cut Bank, Montana, county seat of Glacier County, Montana, United States
  - Cut Bank station, the city's train station
  - Cut Bank Municipal Airport, airport serving the city
- Cut Bank Air Force Station, closed United States Air Force radar station in Montana, United States
- Cut Bank Creek, tributary of the Marias River, northwestern Montana, United States
- Cut Bank Ranger Station Historic District, in Glacier National Park, United States
- Cut Bank Township, Bottineau County, North Dakota, civil township in the United States
- Cut Bank (film), 2014 American thriller directed by Matt Shakman

== See also ==
- Cutbank (disambiguation)
