= Spot Mountain =

Mountain summit in Montana, USA

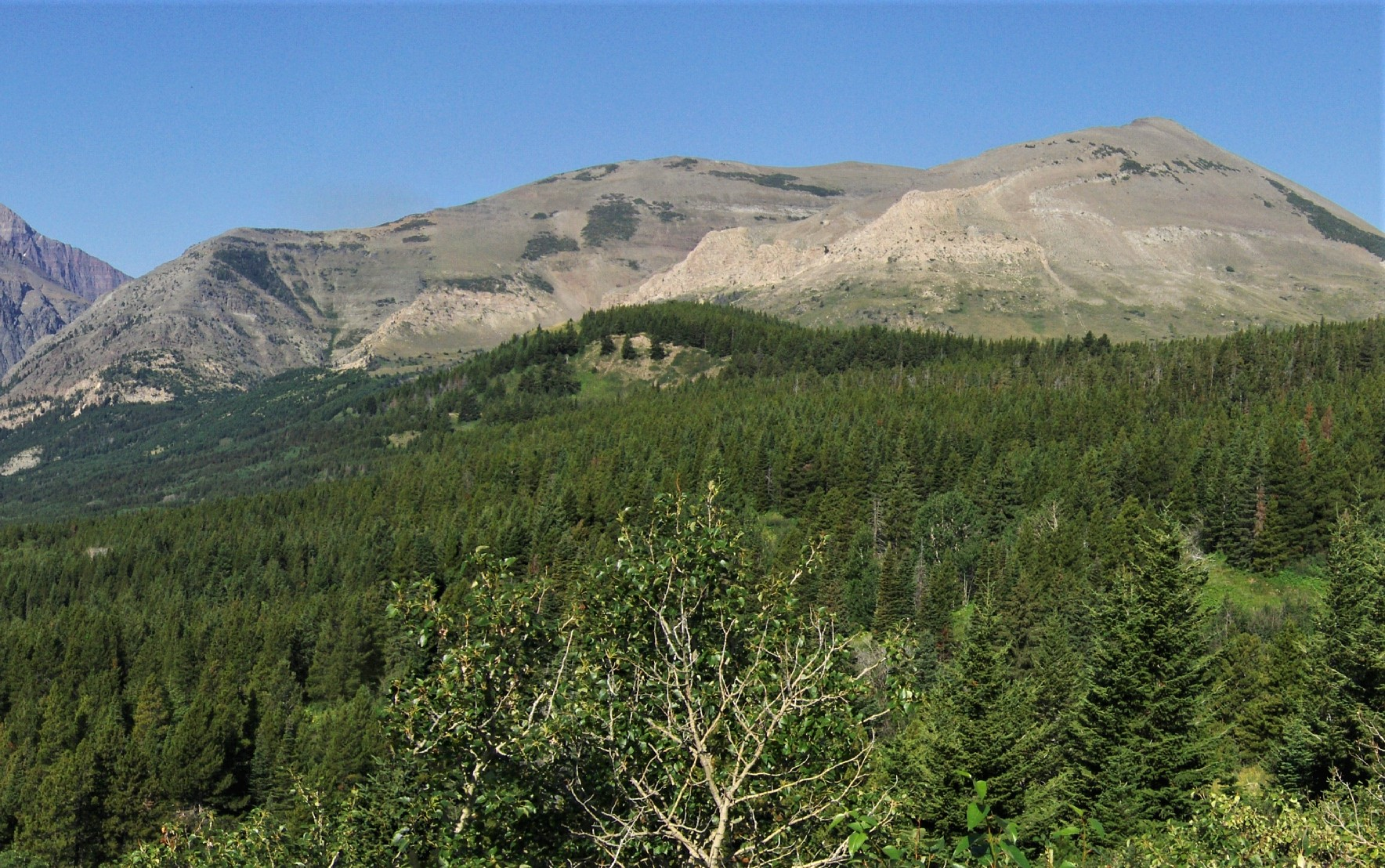
- East aspect

Highest point
- Elevation: 7,831 ft (2,387 m)
- Prominence: 111 ft (34 m)
- Parent peak: Peak 8140
- Isolation: 0.94 mi (1.51 km)
- Coordinates: 48°32′01″N 113°21′21″W

Geography
- Location within Montana Location within the United States
- Location: Glacier National Park; Glacier County, Montana, U.S.
- Parent range: Lewis Range; Rocky Mountains
- Topo map: USGS Kiowa

Spot Mountain is a 7,831-foot-elevation (2,387-meter) mountain summit located in the Two Medicine area of Glacier National Park, in Glacier County, Montana, United States. It is situated in the Lewis Range, nine miles northwest of East Glacier Park Village, and approximately five miles east of the Continental Divide. Precipitation runoff from the mountain drains into tributaries of Cut Bank Creek and Two Medicine River, which merge to form the Marias River. Topographic relief is significant as the south aspect rises nearly 3,000 feet (910 meters) above Lower Two Medicine Lake in two miles. The mountain's name was officially adopted in 1929 by the United States Board on Geographic Names.

== Geology ==
The mountains in Glacier National Park are composed of sedimentary rock laid down during the Precambrian to Jurassic periods. Formed in shallow seas, this sedimentary rock was initially uplifted beginning 170 million years ago when the Lewis Overthrust fault pushed an enormous slab of precambrian rocks 3 mi (4.8 km) thick, 50 miles (80 km) wide and 160 miles (260 km) long over younger rock of the cretaceous period.

== Climate ==
According to the Köppen climate classification system, Spot Mountain is located in an alpine subarctic climate zone with long, cold, snowy winters, and cool to warm summers. Winter temperatures can drop below −10 °F with wind chill factors below −30 °F. Due to its altitude, it receives precipitation all year, as snow in winter, and as thunderstorms in summer.

== Gallery ==
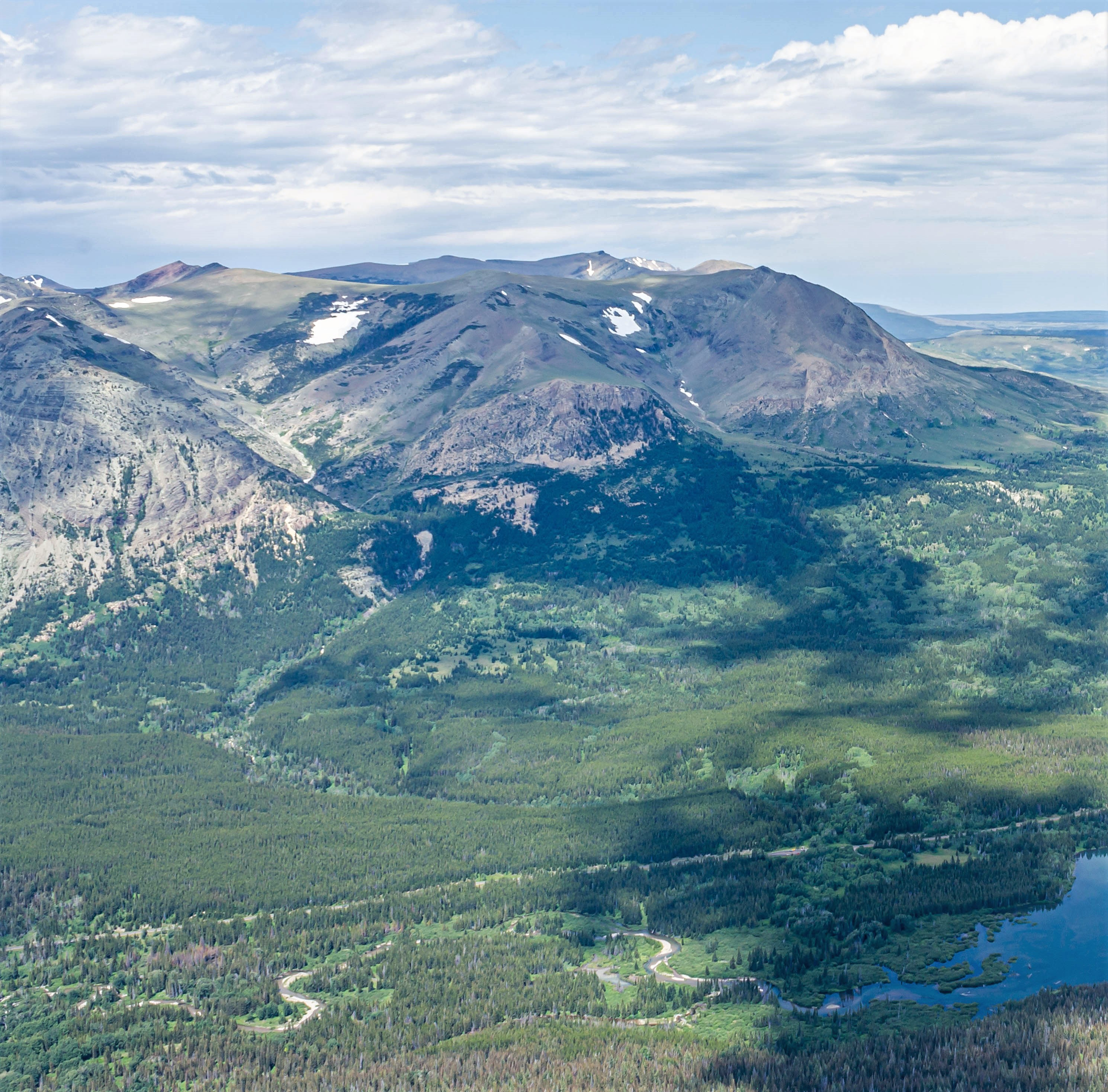
Spot Mountain seen from Scenic Point

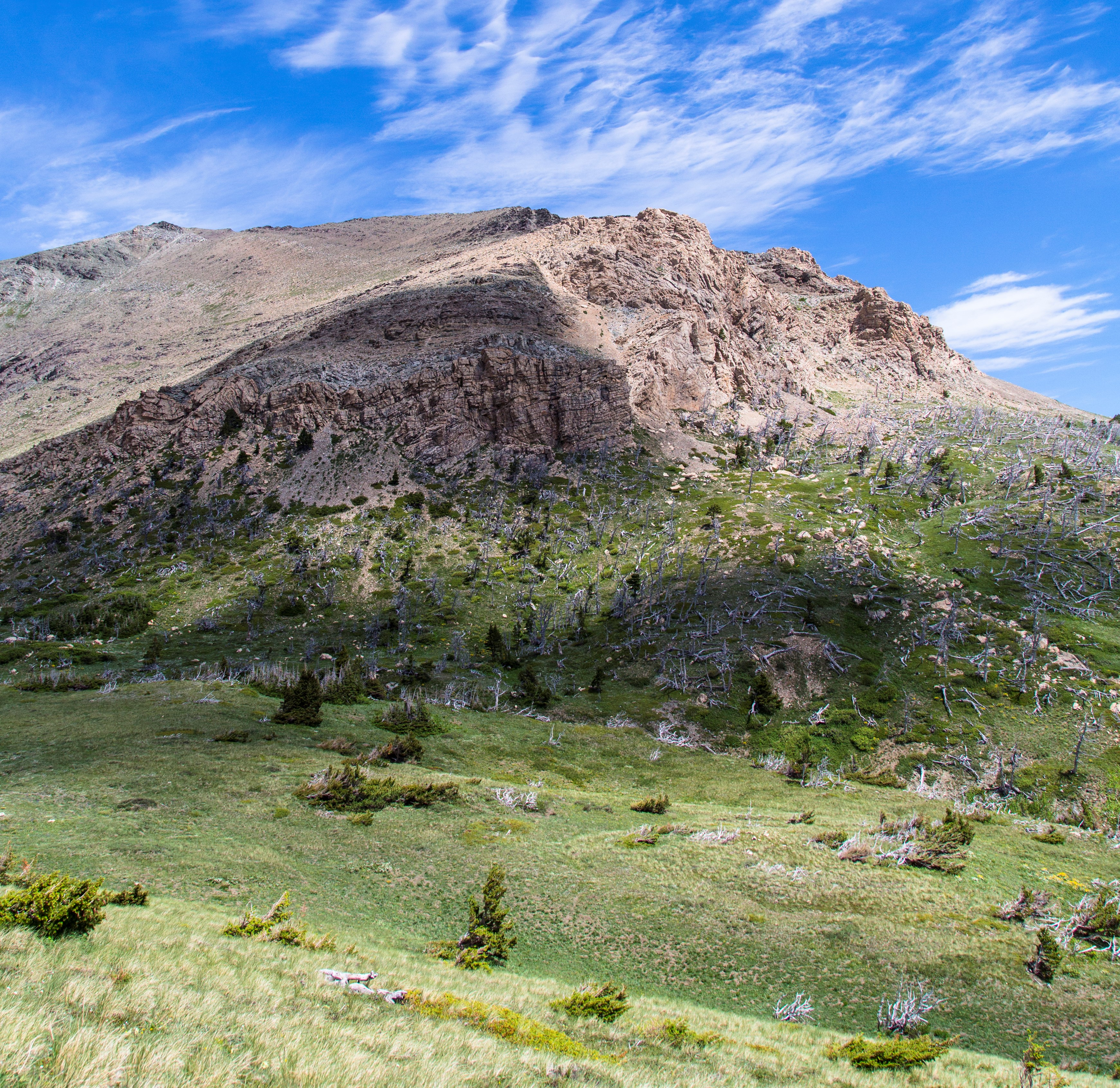
Eastern lobe of Spot Mountain

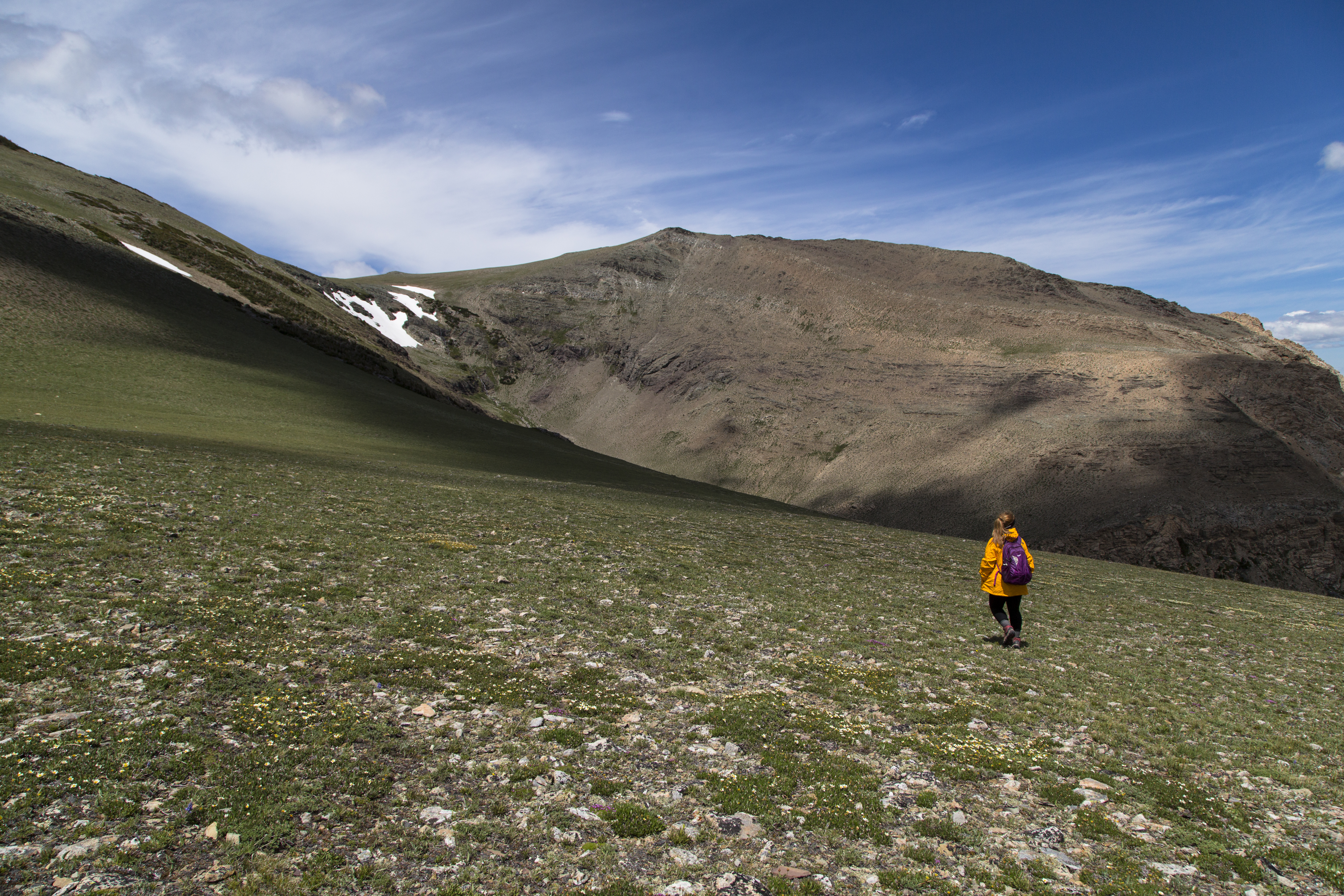
Hiker on Spot Mountain

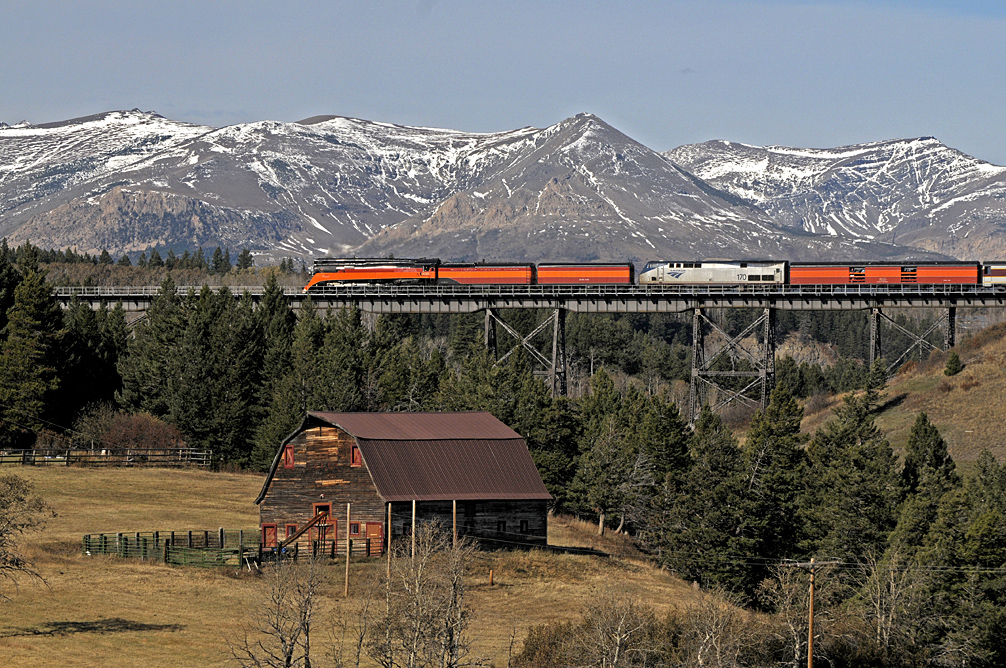
Spot Mountain seen with Two Medicine River train trestle

== See also ==
- Mountains and mountain ranges of Glacier National Park (U.S.)
- Geology of the Rocky Mountains
