= Cut Bank Penguin =

Statue in Cut Bank, Montana

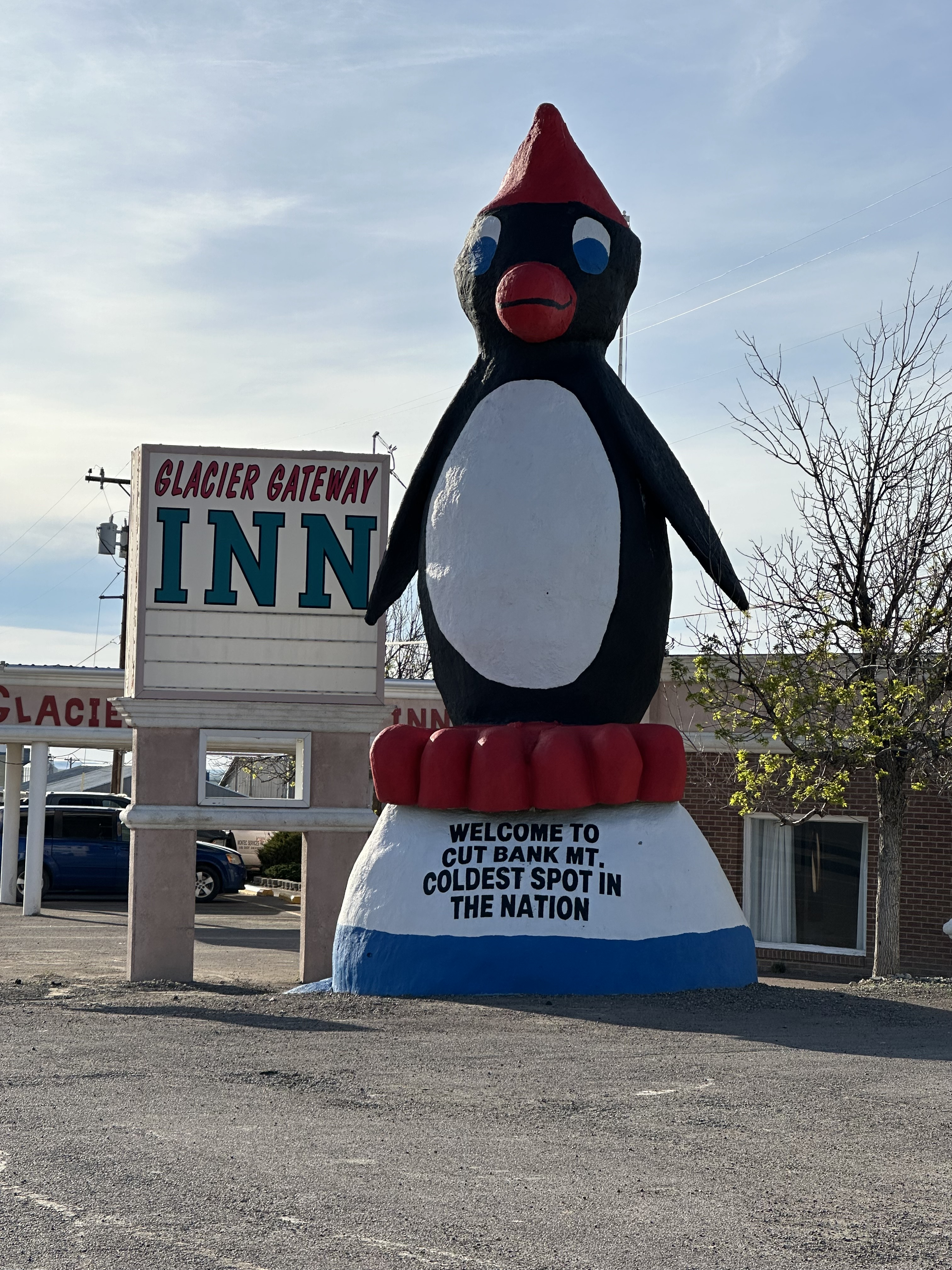
- The Cut Bank Penguin in 2024
- Interactive map of Cut Bank Penguin
- Location: Cut Bank, Montana
- Coordinates: 48°37′47.54″N 112°19′1.12″W
- Material: Concrete
- Height: 27 ft 0 in (8.23 m)

The Cut Bank Penguin is a statue in Cut Bank, Montana. At 27 feet (8.2 m) tall and five tons in weight, the statue is of a cartoon penguin wearing a red hat on an iceberg. Text on the iceberg reads, "Welcome to Cut Bank MT, Coldest Spot in the Nation." The statue was built in 1989 by Ron Gustafson, who got the idea for it after the wind chill in Cut Bank hit −64 °F (−53 °C). In an interview with American Road on why he built the statue, Ron Gustafson stated:

When I was younger, the City of Cut Bank had garbage cans downtown that were shaped like penguins. I don’t know where they came from, but when I remembered those, I knew I was going to build a penguin.

The statue's claim that Cut Bank is the "coldest spot in the nation", likely referring to just the lower 48 states, is still up for debate. The statue originally had a hidden speaker so the penguin could "talk" to people, but it is no longer part of the statue.

In 2013, a similar-looking statue, nicknamed "Ernie", was built in Innisfree, Alberta, for the film Cut Bank; it is not as tall as the Cut Bank Penguin, and the text on the iceberg reads "Welcome to Innisfree, Home of the Cut Bank Penguin."
