= Heltne =

Heltne is a surname of Norwegian origin.

- Anca Heltne, née Vîlceanu (born 1978), Romanian shot putter
- Sivert Heltne Nilsen (born 1991), Norwegian footballer

== Other ==
- The Heltne Oil Company, a site on the National Register of Historic Places located in Havre, Montana, USA, built in 1939
