= Scenic Point =

Mountain in the state of Montana

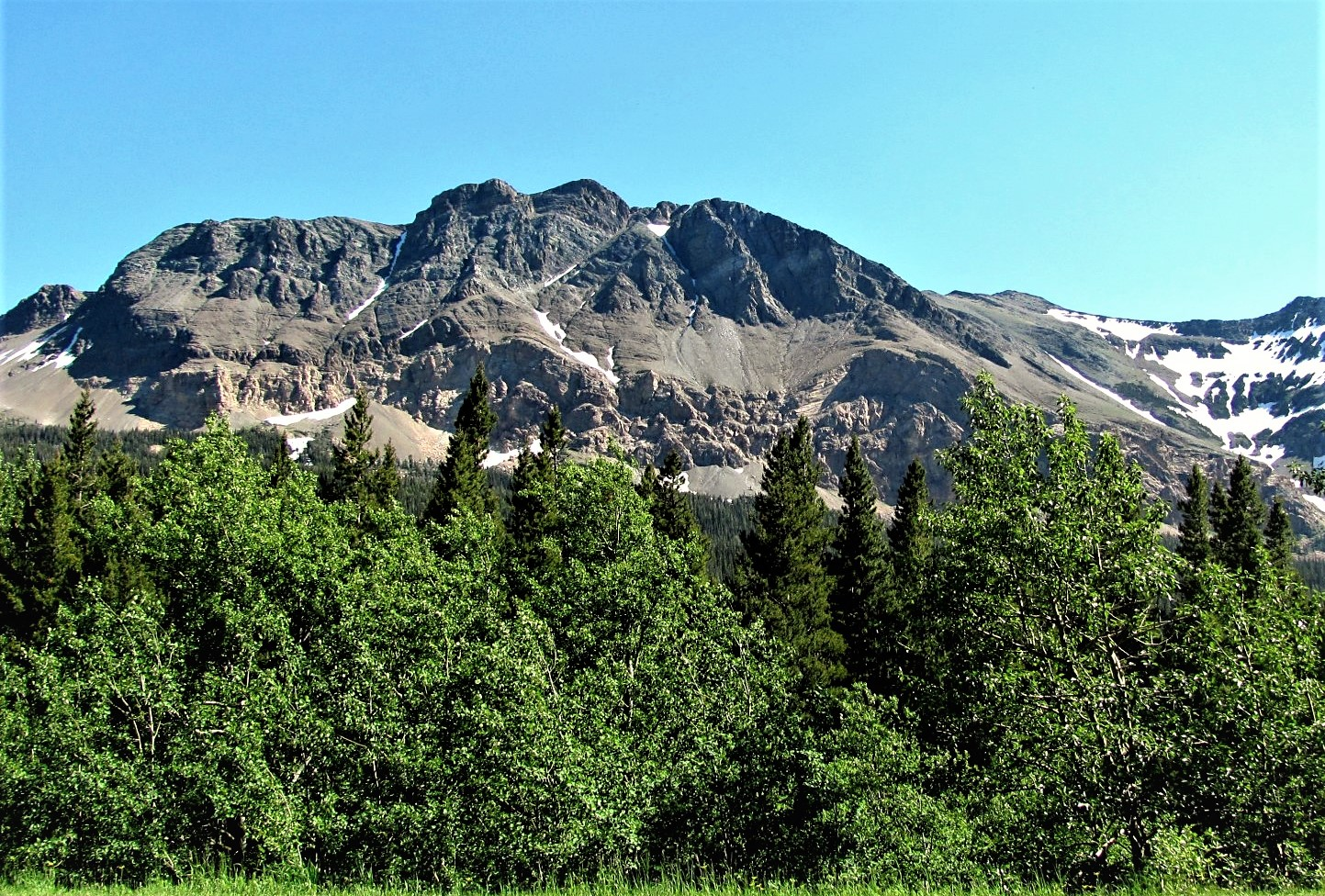
- North aspect, from Two Medicine Road

Highest point
- Elevation: 7,522 ft (2,293 m)
- Prominence: 122 ft (37 m)
- Parent peak: Mount Henry (8,852 ft)
- Isolation: 1.92 mi (3.09 km)
- Coordinates: 48°29′05″N 113°19′20″W

Geography
- Location within Montana Location within the United States
- Location: Glacier National Park; Glacier County, Montana, U.S.
- Parent range: Lewis Range; Rocky Mountains
- Topo map: USGS Dancing Lady Mountain

Climbing
- Easiest route: hiking trail

Scenic Point is a 7,522-foot-elevation (2,293-meter) mountain summit located in the Two Medicine area of Glacier National Park, in Glacier County, Montana, United States. It is situated in the Lewis Range, six miles northwest of East Glacier Park Village, and approximately seven miles east of the Continental Divide, with precipitation runoff from the mountain draining into the Two Medicine River watershed. Topographic relief is significant as the north aspect rises over 2,600 feet (790 meters) above Lower Two Medicine Lake in one mile. Access to the summit is via the Continental Divide National Scenic Trail which traverses the upper slopes of this mountain. The trail to Scenic Point was constructed by the Great Northern Railway, and the summit once hosted a locomotive bell, a Swiss Alps tradition. The mountain's name was officially adopted in 1929 by the United States Board on Geographic Names.

== Geology ==
The mountains in Glacier National Park are composed of sedimentary rock laid down during the Precambrian to Jurassic periods. Formed in shallow seas, this sedimentary rock was initially uplifted beginning 170 million years ago when the Lewis Overthrust fault pushed an enormous slab of precambrian rocks 3 mi (4.8 km) thick, 50 miles (80 km) wide and 160 miles (260 km) long over younger rock of the cretaceous period.

== Climate ==
According to the Köppen climate classification system, Scenic Point is located in an alpine subarctic climate zone with long, cold, snowy winters, and cool to warm summers. Winter temperatures can drop below −10 °F with wind chill factors below −30 °F. Due to its altitude, it receives precipitation all year, as snow in winter, and as thunderstorms in summer.

== Gallery ==
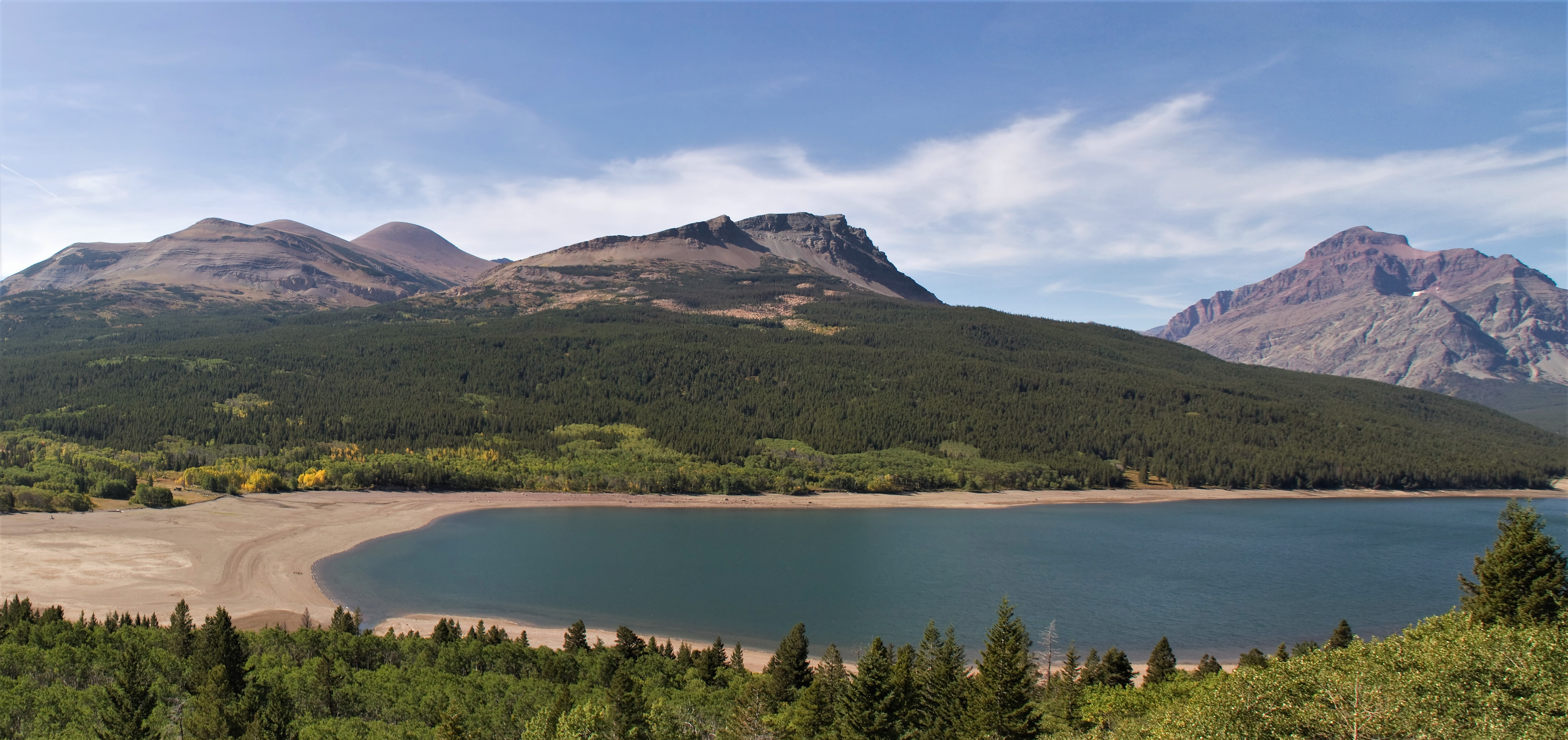
East aspect centered. Rising Wolf Mountain to right.

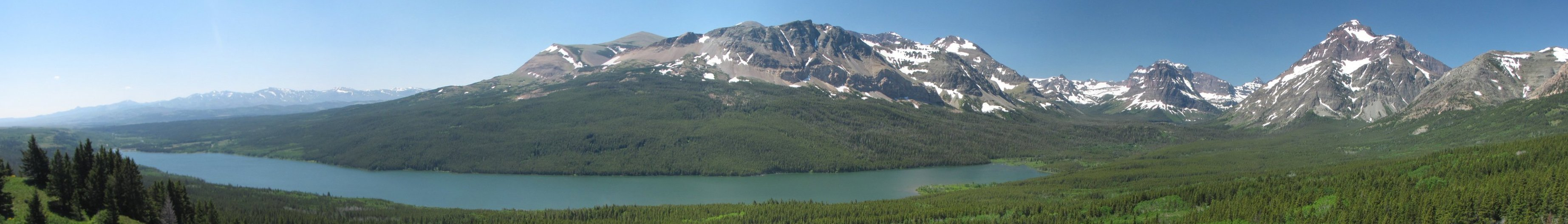
North aspect (centered) above Lower Two Medicine Lake

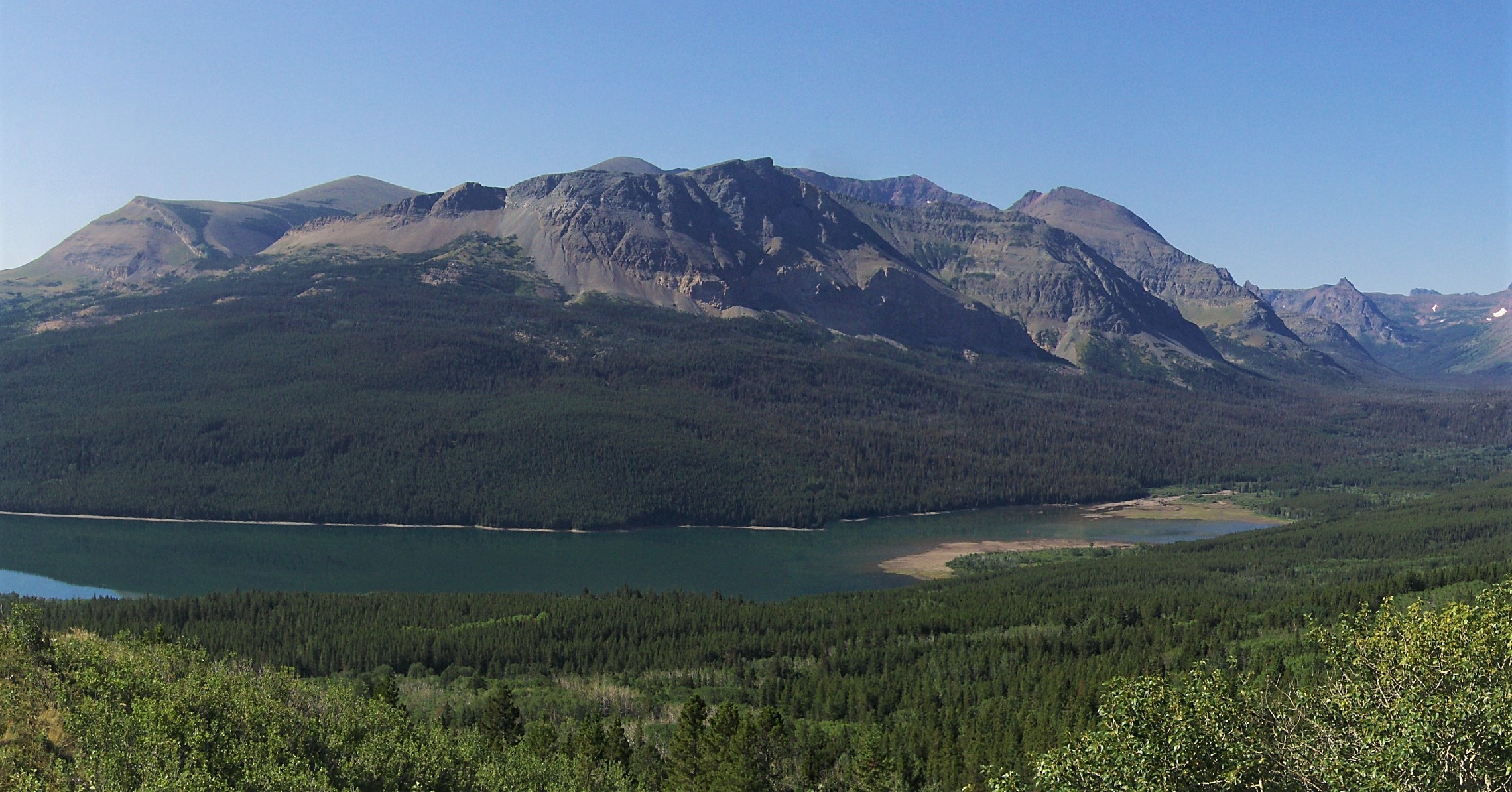
North aspect centered above Lower Two Medicine Lake

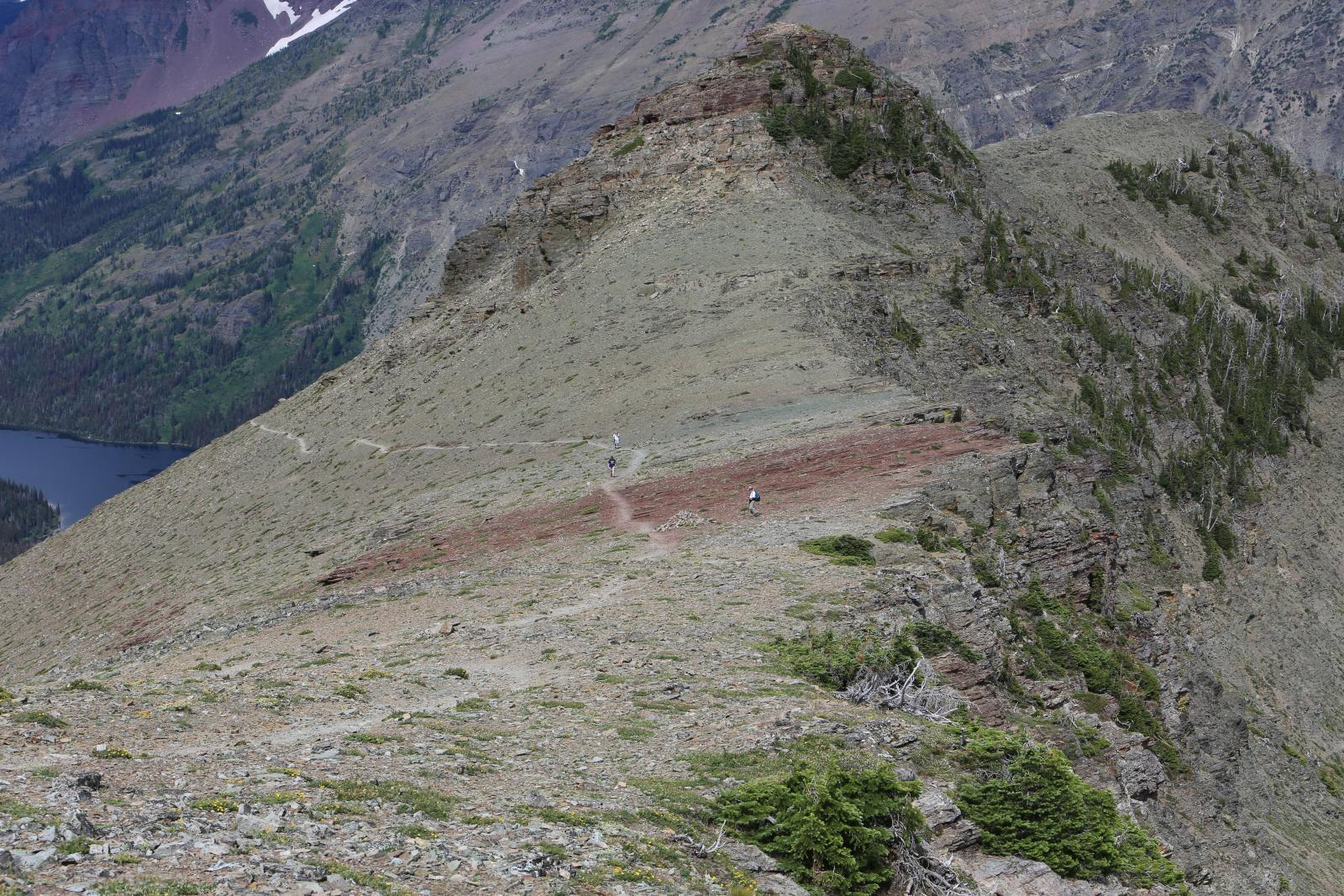
Scenic Point trail

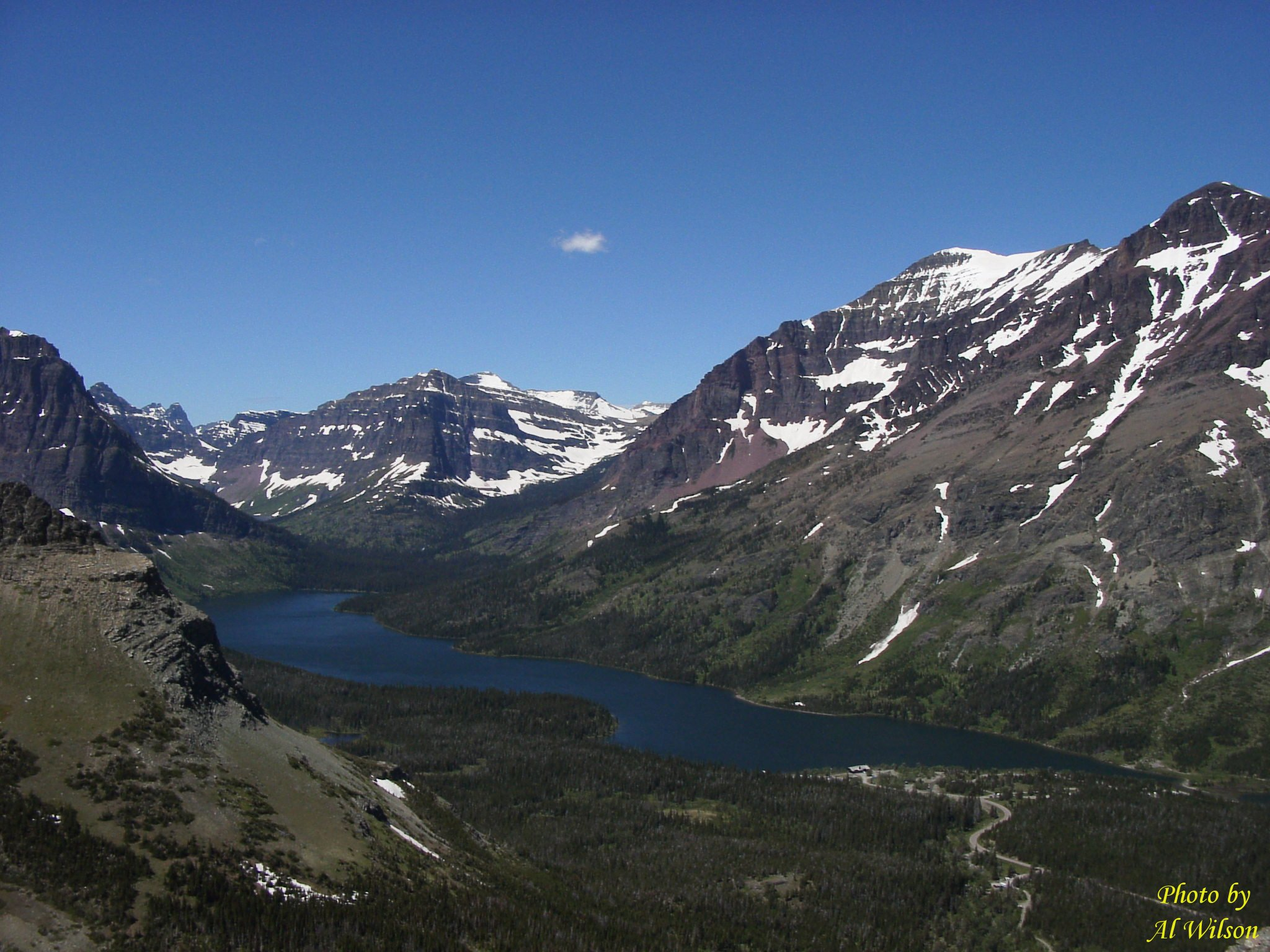
Two Medicine Lake seen from the trail to Scenic Point

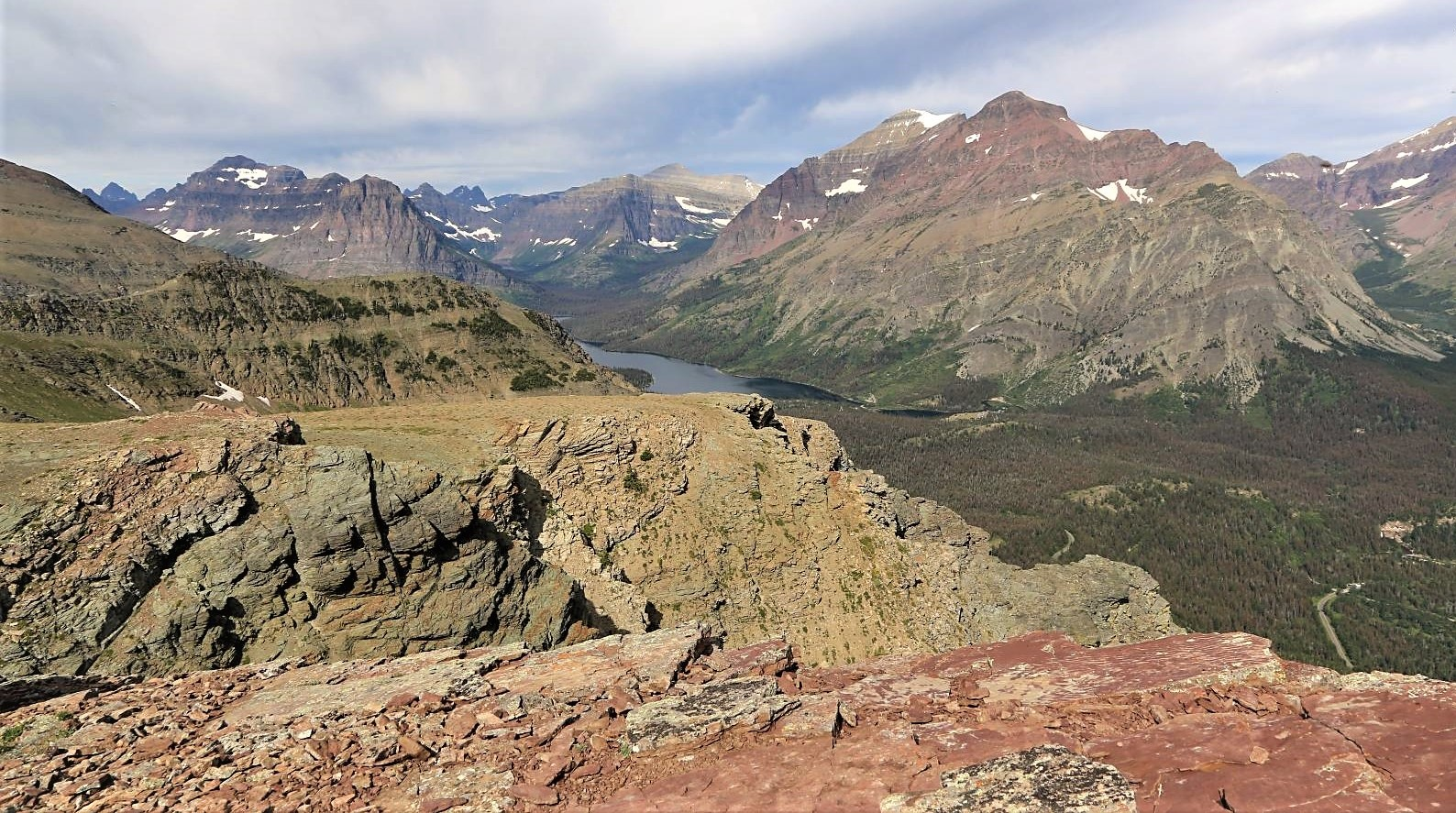
Scenic Point summit view looking west, with Rising Wolf Mountain to right.

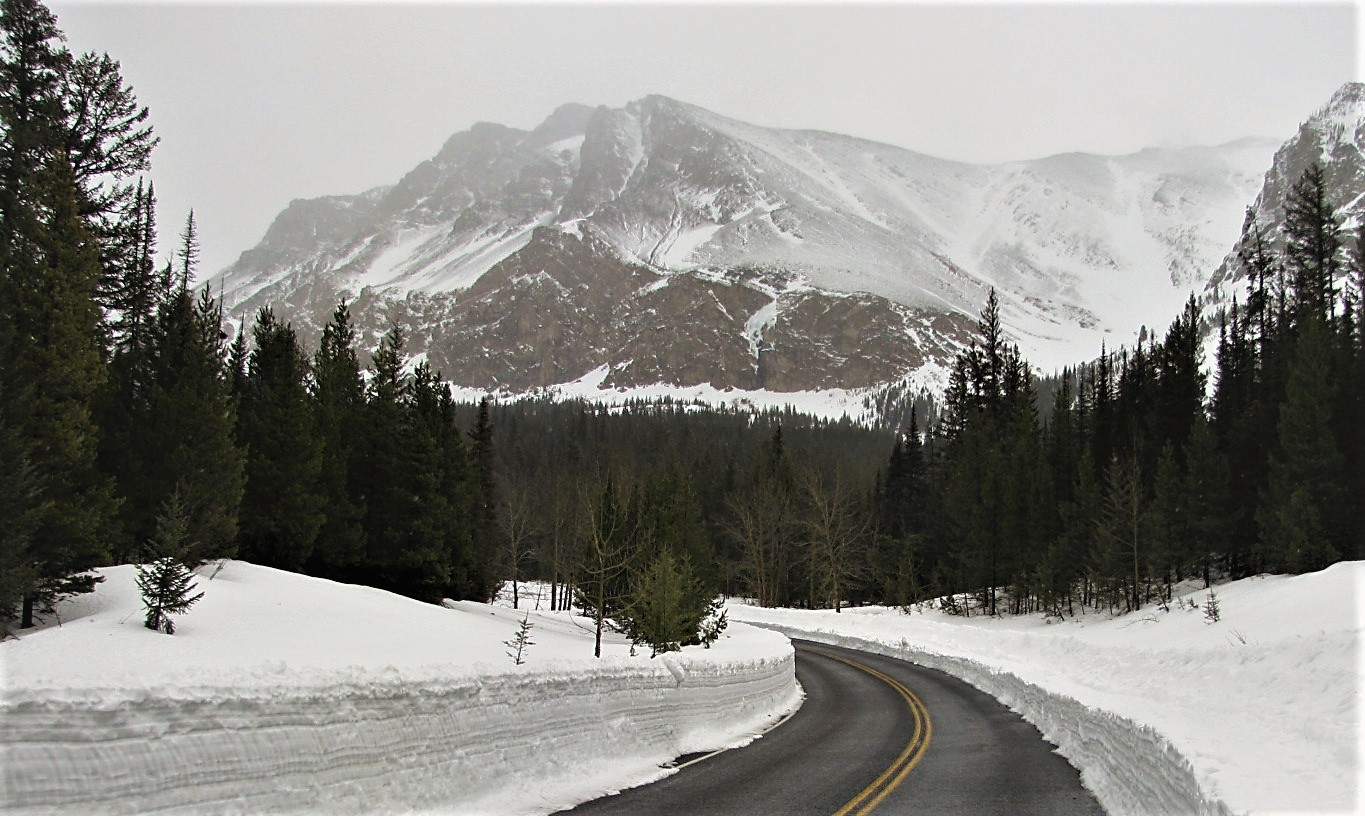
Northwest aspect seen from Two Medicine Road

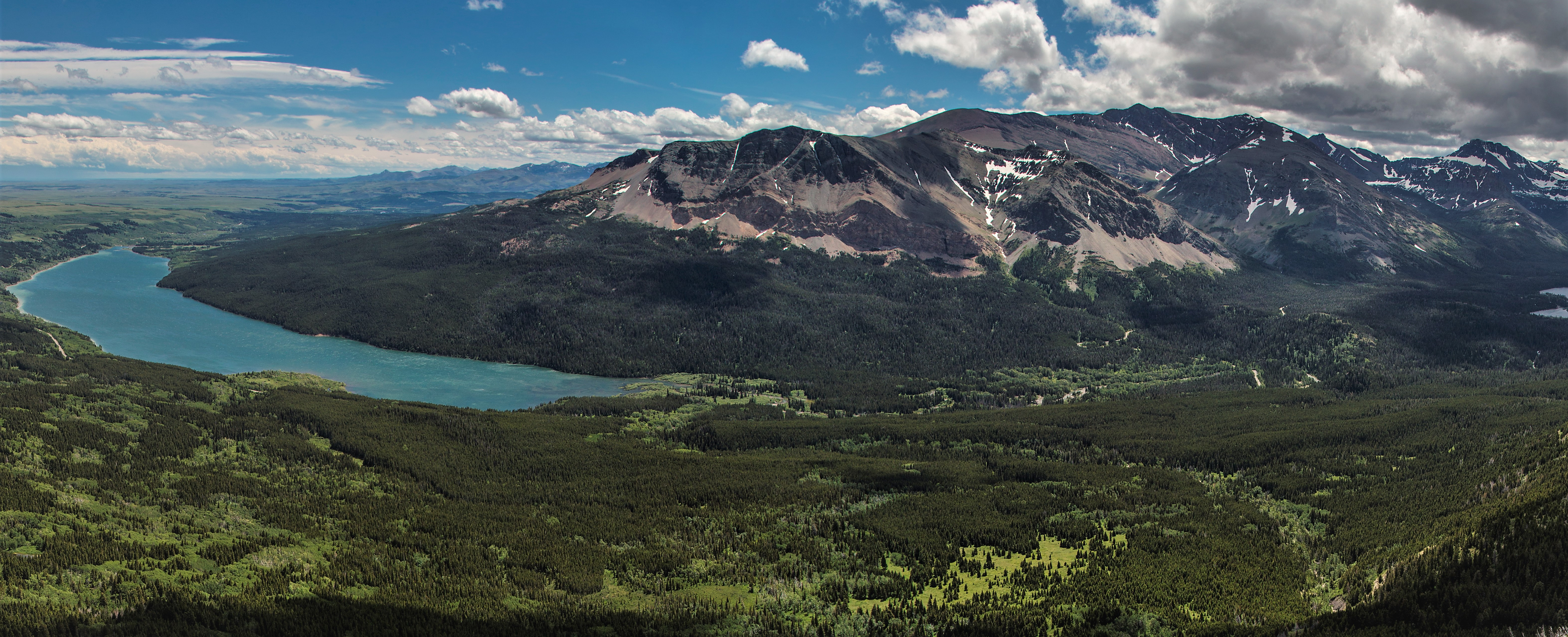
Scenic Point (centered) seen from Spot Mountain

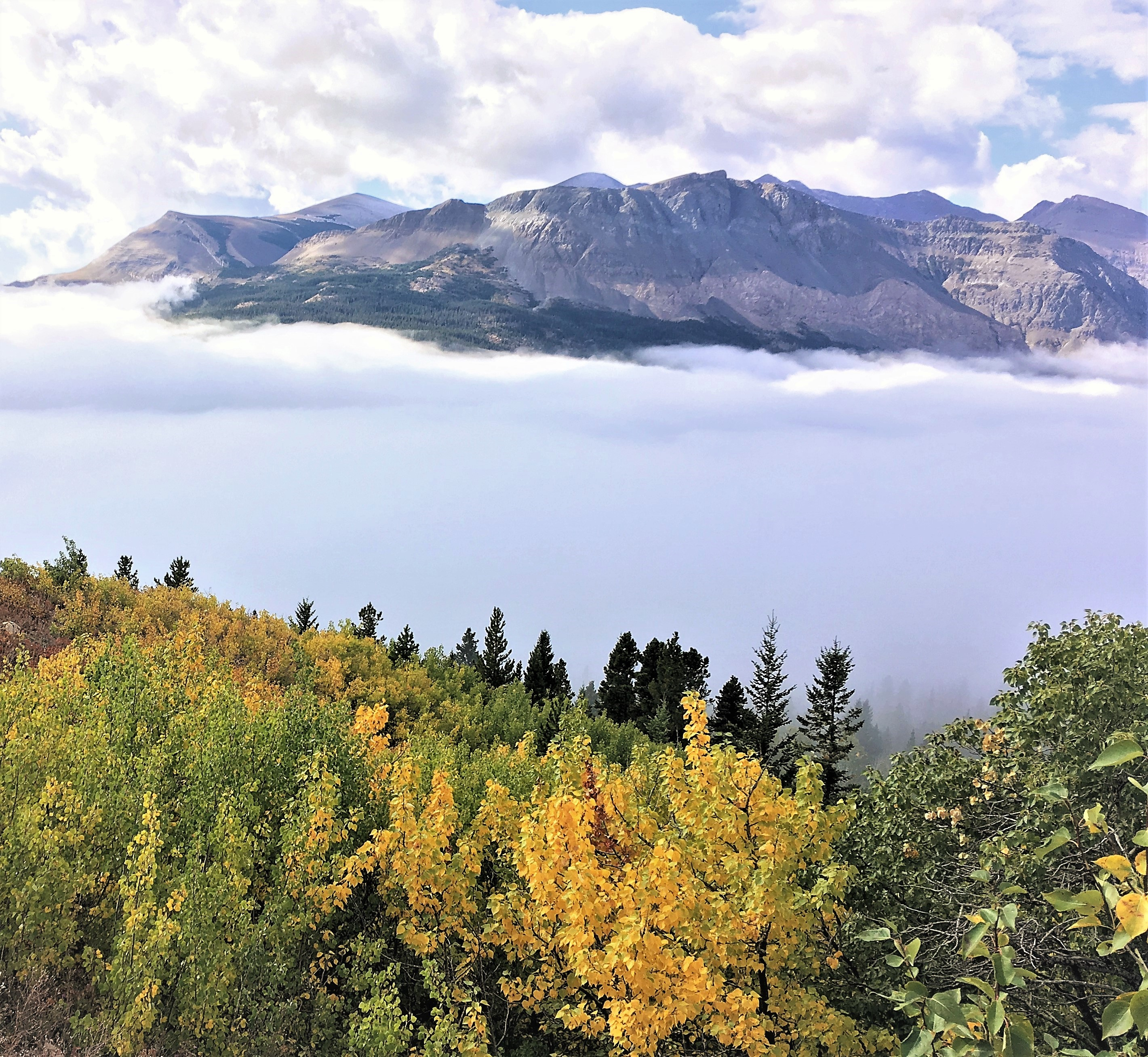
Scenic Point from Highway 49

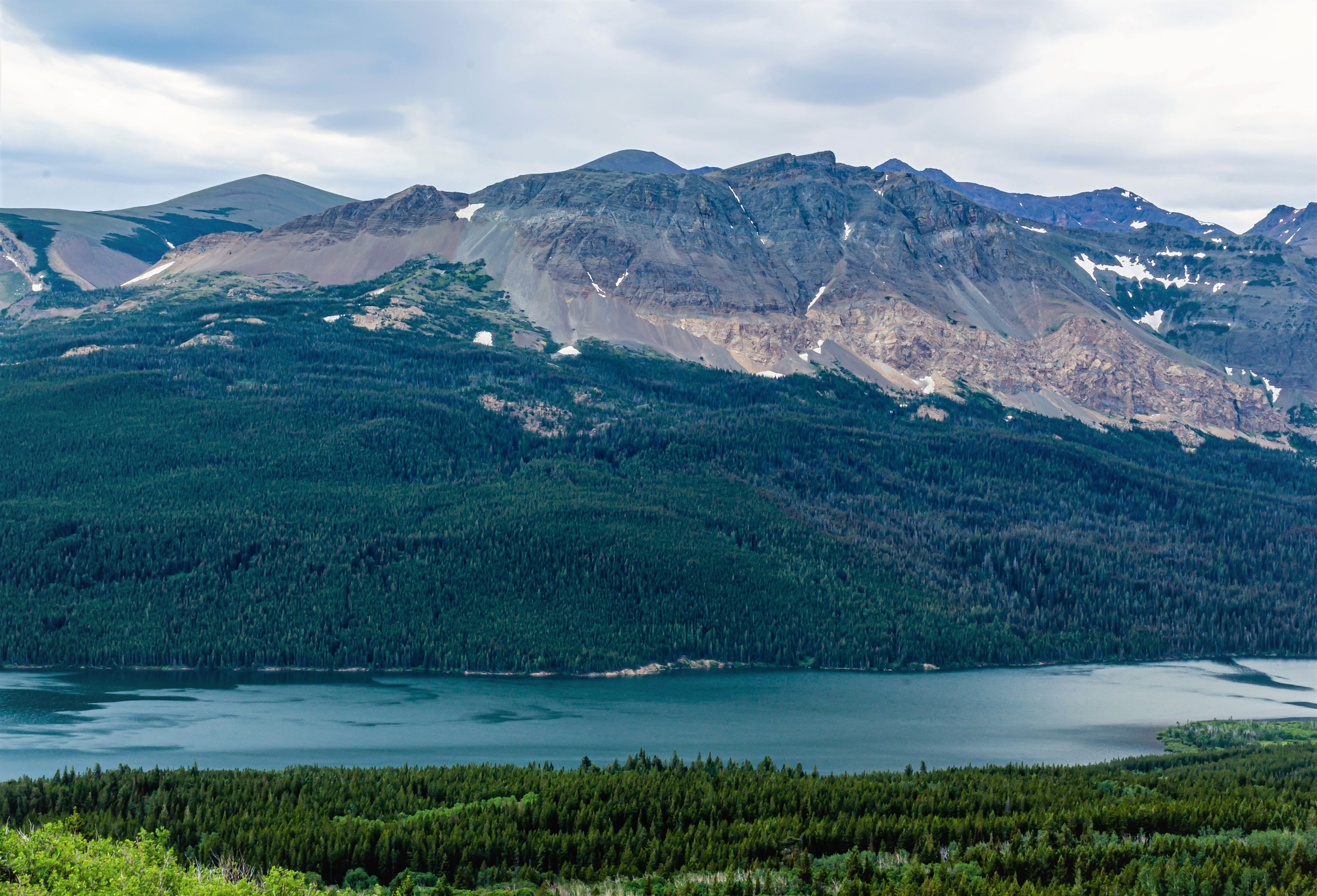
Scenic Point rises above Lower Two Medicine Lake

== See also ==
- Mountains and mountain ranges of Glacier National Park (U.S.)
- Geology of the Rocky Mountains
