= Browning station =

Railway station in Montana, United States

Browning, MT
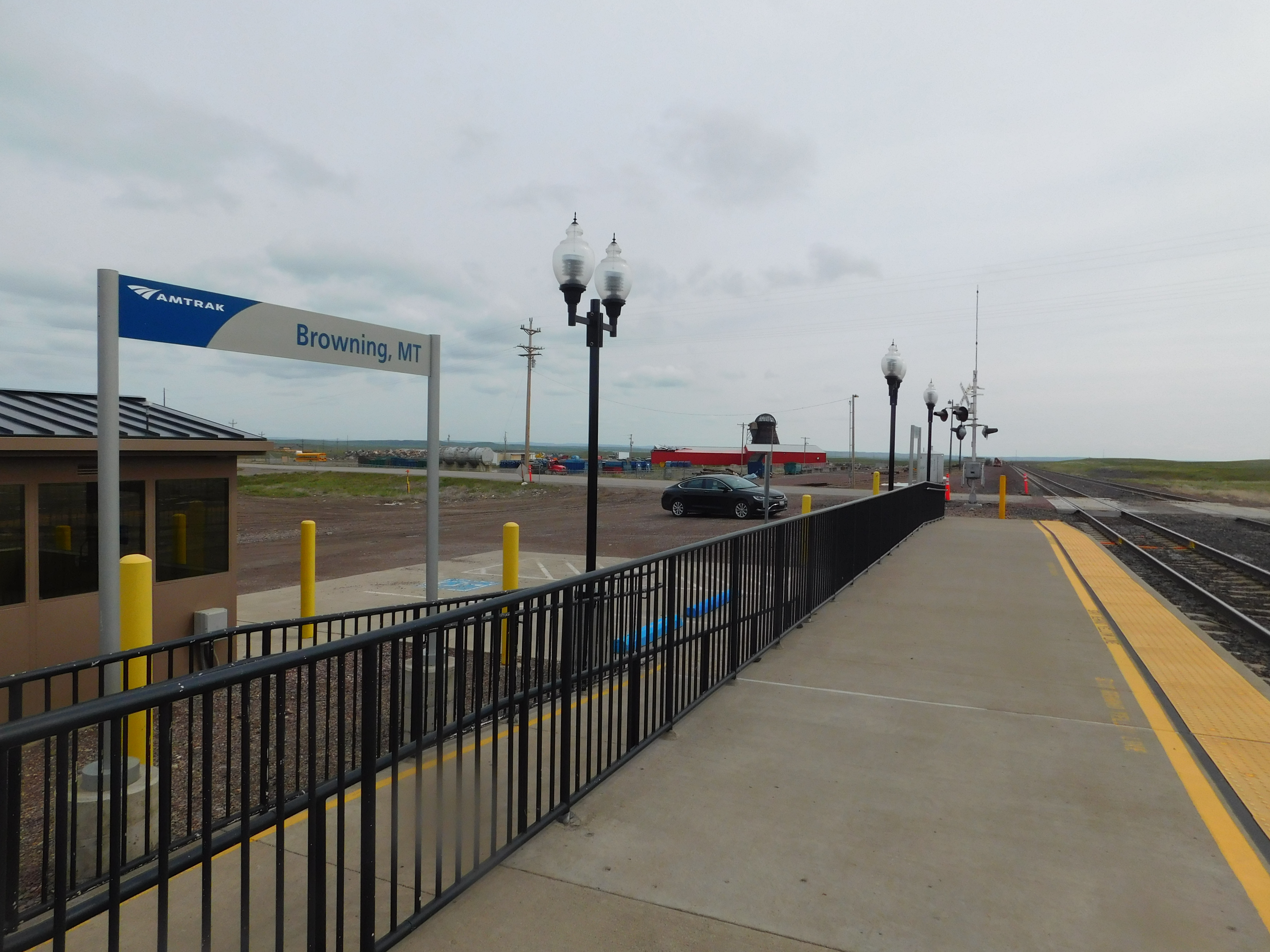
- Browning station platform, May 2017

General information
- Location: Heart Butte Road & Depot Road; Browning, Montana; United States
- Coordinates: 48.53393°N 113.01321°W
- Owner: Amtrak/BNSF Railway
- Line: BNSF Hi Line Subdivision
- Platforms: 1 side platform
- Tracks: 2

Construction
- Parking: Yes
- Accessible: Yes

Other information
- Status: Open seasonally (October–April); platform with shelter
- Station code: Amtrak: BRO

History
- Rebuilt: 2012
- Former names: Fort Browning

Passengers
- FY 2025: 1,203 (Amtrak)

Services
| Preceding station | Amtrak | Following station |
|---|---|---|
| Essex toward Seattle or Portland | Empire Builder (October–April) | Cut Bank toward Chicago |
Former services
| Preceding station | Great Northern Railway | Following station |
|---|---|---|
| Triple Divide toward Seattle | Main Line | Blackfoot toward St. Paul |
Location

Browning station is a train station in Browning, Montana. It is a seasonal stop for Amtrak's Empire Builder, open from October to April. It serves Browning and the rest of the Blackfeet Indian Reservation, as well as the eastern side of Glacier National Park. It functions as an alternate for the East Glacier Park station at Glacier National Park, which closes during the winter.

The station, platform, and parking are owned by BNSF Railway with the station facilities owned by Amtrak. Amtrak rebuilt the station in 2012 to be accessible to people with disabilities by adding a 110-foot (34 m) concrete platform, a ramp, platform lighting, a wheelchair lift enclosure and accessible parking spaces. The old Great Northern Railway station building was removed in 2013, leaving only the platform and parking area. The Great Northern station was known as Fort Browning.
