= Heltne Oil Company =

- U.S. National Register of Historic Places
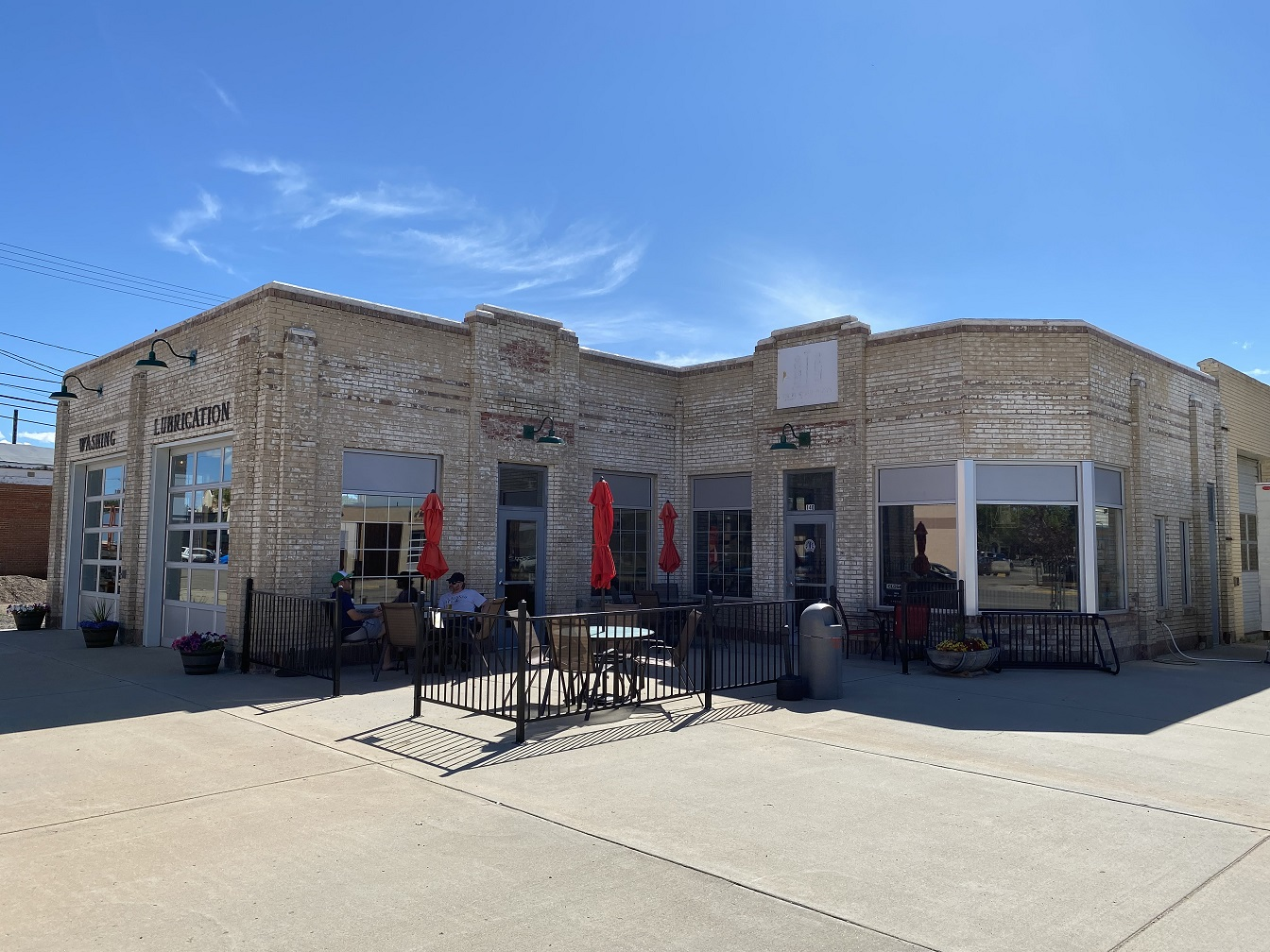

- Location within Montana Location within the United States
- Location: 140 First St. Havre, Montana
- Coordinates: 48°33′14″N 109°40′44″W
- Area: less than one acre
- Built: 1939
- Built by: E. O'Hare
- Architectural style: Moderne
- MPS: Roadside Architecture Along US 2 in Montana MPS
- NRHP reference No.: 94000865
- Added to NRHP: August 16, 1994

The Heltne Oil Company is a site on the National Register of Historic Places located in Havre, Montana. It was added to the Register on August 16, 1984.

It was built in 1939 by the Northwest Refining Company of Cut Bank, Montana and was leased by Danfield Heltne; the business stayed in the Heltne family through the date of NRHP application. The building is described in its NRHP nomination as "an outstanding example of the transitional period of gas station design between the more ornate styling of the early 1930s and the porcelain-enameled oblong box so dominant after the war." It has two-toned decorative brickwork, which, "together with ornamental pilasters blend nicely with the more modern and functional aspects of the design. Large windows to display company products and accessories together with more spacious enclosed service bays reflect the changes taking place in the service station industry during the late 1930s."

It was deemed "significant for its association with automobile travel along US 2 from the late 1930s through the early post-war era, as well as for its architecture.
