= Lower Two Medicine Lake =

Lake in Glacier County, Montana

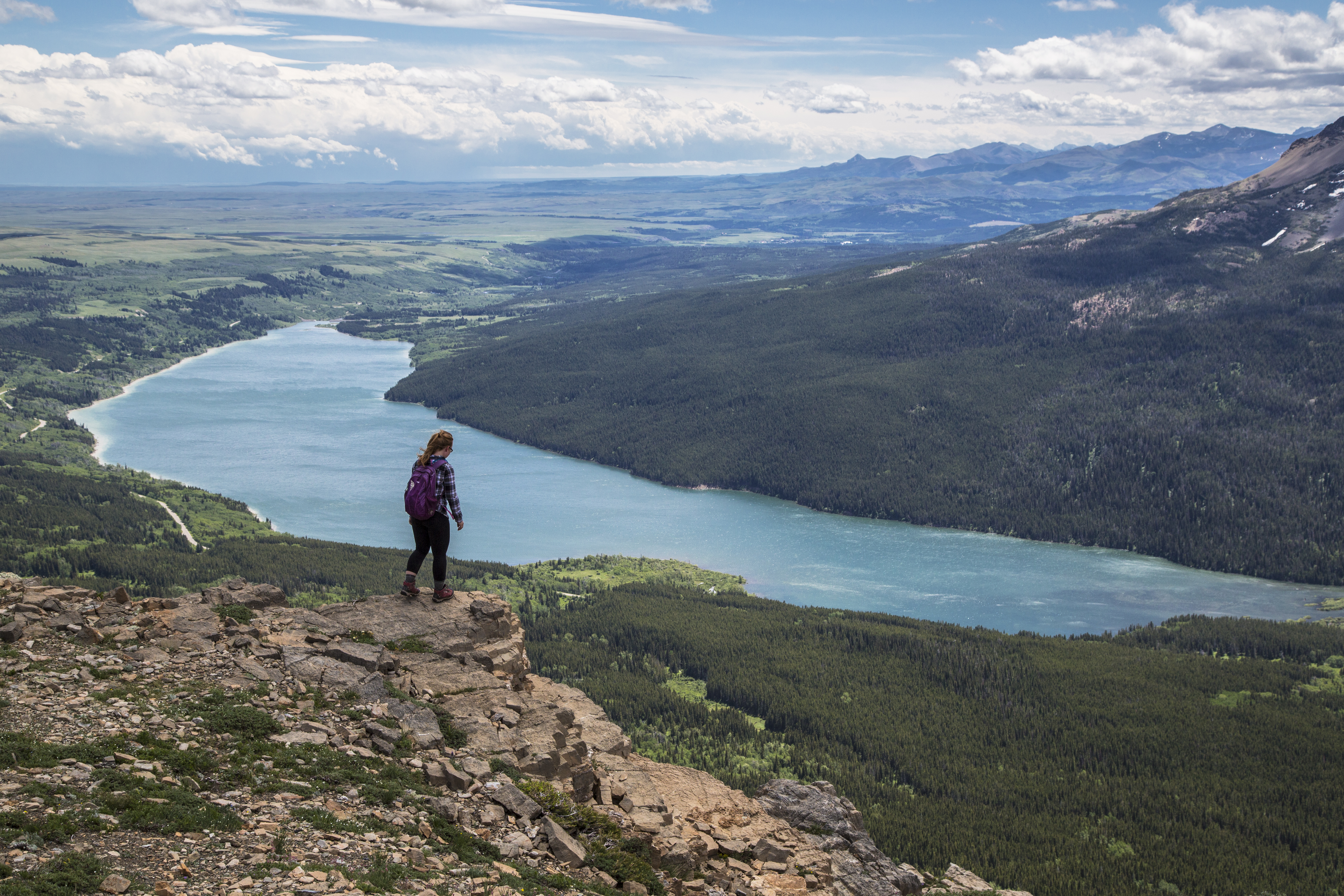
- Lower Two Medicine Lake seen from Spot Mountain

- Location within Montana Location within the United States
- Location: Glacier National Park, Glacier County, Montana, US
- Coordinates: 48°29′32″N 113°15′49″W
- Type: Natural/Dam
- Primary inflows: Two Medicine Creek
- Primary outflows: Two Medicine River
- Basin countries: United States
- Max. length: 2 miles (3.2 km)
- Max. width: 0.40 miles (0.64 km)
- Surface elevation: 4,882 ft (1,488 m)

Lower Two Medicine Lake is a natural freshwater lake in Montana, jointly owned by Glacier National Park and the Blackfeet Indian Reservation. A permit is necessary to fish in the eastern half, owned by the Blackfeet Indian Reservation.

The water level is regulated by Lower Two Medicine Dam, an earthen structure built in 1967 for flood control and irrigation storage. It is owned and operated by the Bureau of Indian Affairs.

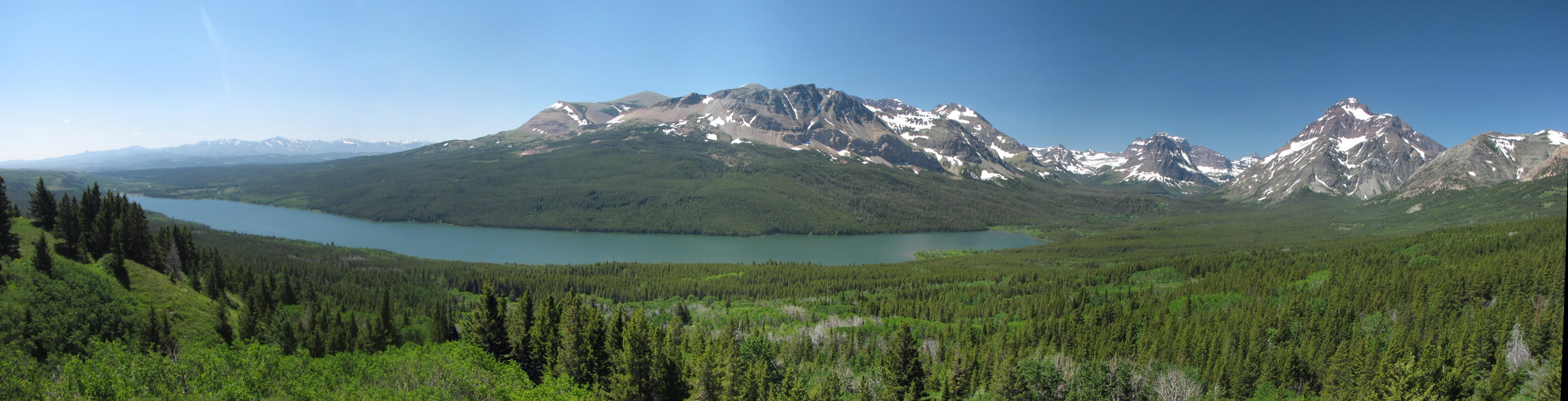
Lower Two Medicine Lake with Scenic Point (centered) and Rising Wolf Mountain (right)

== See also ==
- List of lakes in Glacier County, Montana
