= Cutbank =

CutBank is a literary journal. Cutbank may also refer to:

- Cutbank, Saskatchewan, unincorporated hamlet in Loreburn Rural Municipality No. 254, Saskatchewan, Canada
- Cutbank River, tributary of the Smoky River in western Alberta, Canada
- Cutbank Sandstone, member of the Lower Mannville geologic formation in southern Alberta, Canada

== See also ==
- Cut Bank (disambiguation)
