= East Glacier Park station =

Train station in Montana

East Glacier Park, MT
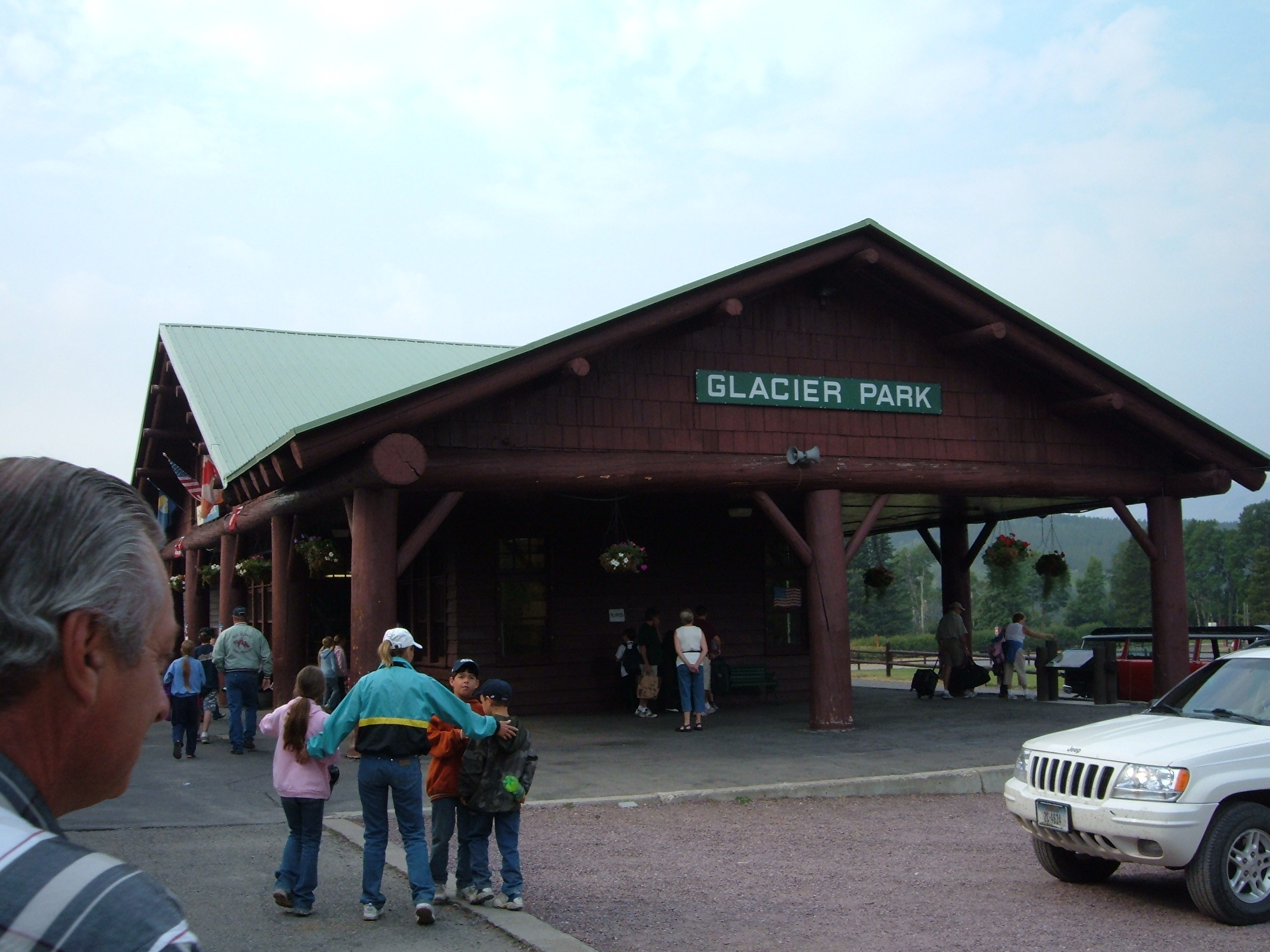
- East Glacier Park station building

General information
- Location: 400 Hwy 49 North; East Glacier Park Village, Montana; United States
- Coordinates: 48.4439°N 113.2185°W
- Owner: BNSF Railway
- Line: BNSF Hi Line Subdivision
- Platforms: 1 side platform
- Tracks: 3

Construction
- Parking: Yes
- Accessible: Yes

Other information
- Status: Open seasonally (April–October); Station building with waiting room
- Station code: Amtrak: GPK

History
- Opened: 1913
- Former names: Glacier Park

Passengers
- FY 2025: 10,996 (Amtrak)

Services
Preceding station	Amtrak	Following station
Essex toward Seattle or Portland	Empire Builder (April–October)	Cut Bank toward Chicago
Former services
Preceding station	Great Northern Railway	Following station
Bison toward Seattle	Main Line	Spotted Robe toward St. Paul
Location

East Glacier Park station is a train station in East Glacier Park Village, Montana. It is a seasonal stop for Amtrak's Empire Builder line, open from April to October. It serves mostly visitors to Glacier National Park. It functions as an alternate to Browning station on the Blackfeet Indian Reservation, which opens from October to April.

The historic Glacier Park Lodge was built in 1913 by the Great Northern Railway. The hotel is within a block's distance from the station, and thus arriving passengers can walk to the Glacier Park Hotel if they wish, but typically a van from the hotel meets the train and will carry passengers and their luggage to the hotel. The station, platform, and parking are owned by BNSF Railway. This station operates during the summer only.

The station has a sign that reads Glacier Park (its historic former name), but the current "East Glacier Park" name is used on Amtrak schedules and by train personnel when making the onboard arrival announcement.
