= Cut Bank High School =

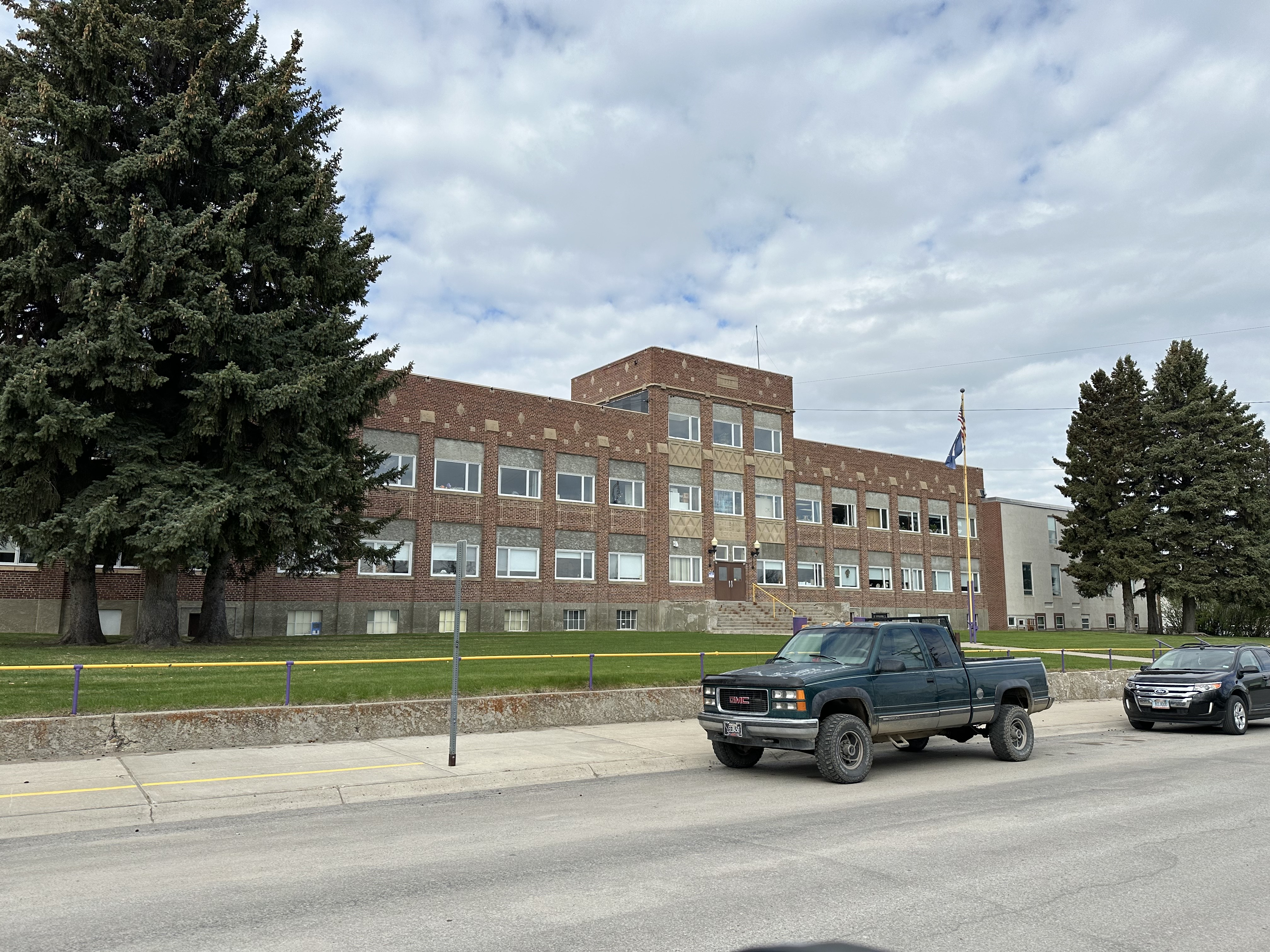
- Main entrance on 1st Street SE

Location
- 101 3rd Ave SE, Cut Bank, MT; Cut Bank, Montana 59427; 48°37′57.62″N 112°19′50.04″W

Information
- Established: 1910 (officially); 1913 (recognized)
- School district: Cut Bank School District #15
- Superintendent: Wade Sundby
- Principal: Jared Berkram
- Teaching staff: 16.86 (FTE)
- Grades: 9–12
- Enrollment: 198 (2023–2024)
- Student to teacher ratio: 11.74
- Colors: Purple and Gold
- Fight song: Based on Washington State's fight song
- Mascot: Wolf
- Team name: Wolves (boys); Lady Wolves (girls)
- Rival: Shelby High School; Fairfield High School
- Newspaper: LiveWire
- Website: https://www.cutbankschools.net/cbhs

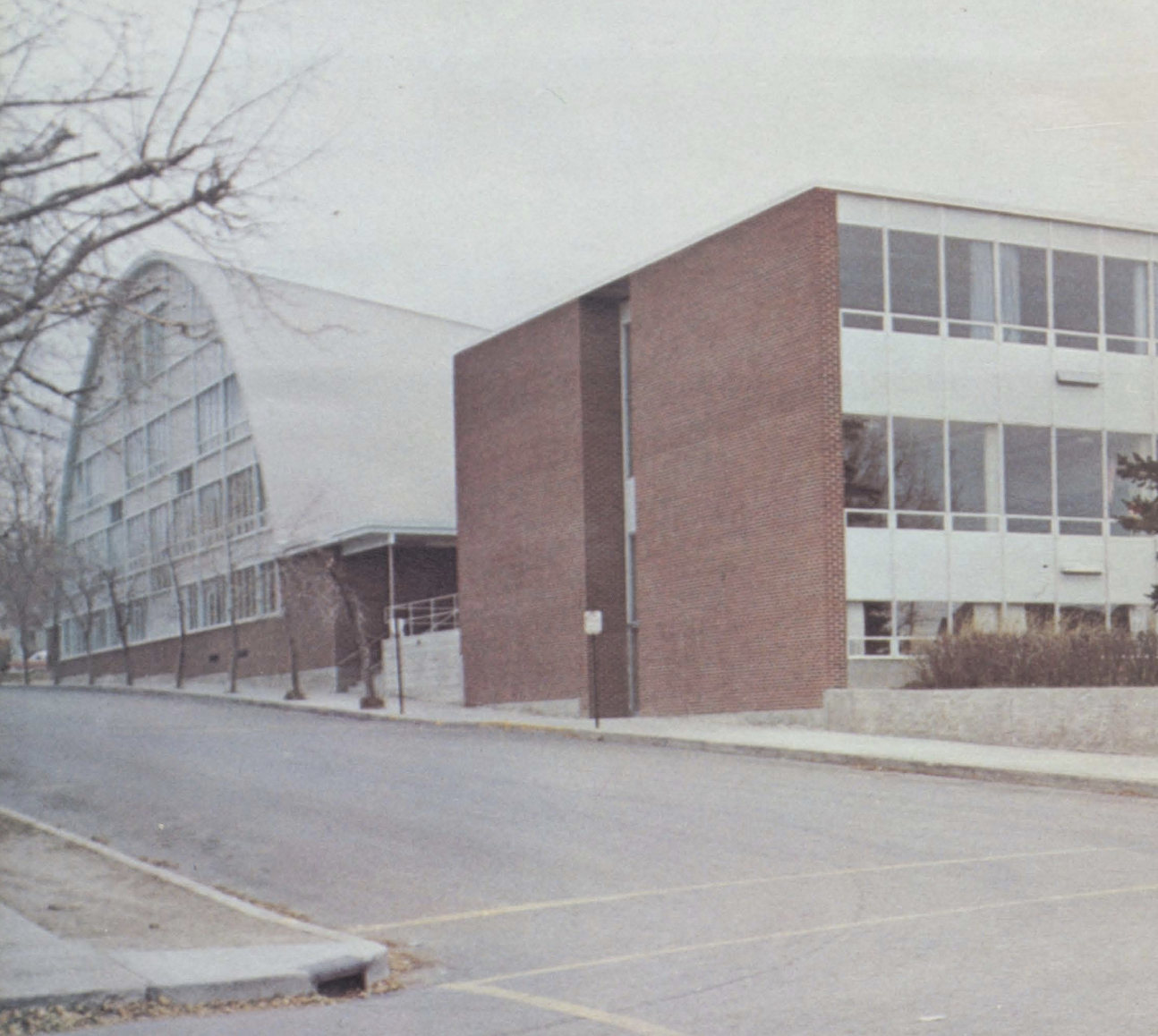
Cut Bank High School in 1969. The year after this photo was taken, a fire burnt down the school's gymnasium

Cut Bank High School is a public high school located in Cut Bank, Montana, with students in grades 9 through 12. The school is part of the Cut Bank Public Schools system. As of the 2022–2023 school year, the school has an enrollment of 227 students. The school is attached to Willie DeGroot Gymnasium, one of the largest high school gymnasiums in Montana. Cut Bank High School is partnered with Logan Health, offering students physical and mental health services. The superintendent of the school is Wade Sundby and the principal is Jared Berkram.

== Founding ==
Much of the information surrounding the founding of Cut Bank High School is either unclear or contradictory.

The first educational building located in Cut Bank, not to be confused with the present Cut Bank High School, was a one-room school building established in 1902. The building, now known as the Marias School, still stands as part of the Glacier Historical Museum.

The current Cut Bank High School, although located two blocks away from where it currently is, was established in 1910. The building where Cut Bank High School is currently located began construction in 1936. Cut Bank Middle School, which is attached to Cut Bank High School, began construction in 1942. The school celebrated its 50th anniversary in 1963, implying the school recognizes 1913 as its founding year.

== Gym fire ==
On May 20, 1970, the gymnasium of Cut Bank High School burnt down. The fire completely destroyed the gymnasium and some of the surrounding area. After the fire, the school constructed the new Willie DeGroot Gymnasium, as well as new classrooms, an auditorium, and a library. In the time between the construction of the new gym and the fire, trailers were used as replacement classrooms.

== Student population ==
Cut Bank High School, as of 2023, has a total of 198 students. Niche ranks Cut Bank High School as the most diverse public high school in the state of Montana.

== Athletics ==
Cut Bank High School's colors are purple and gold and school mascot is the Wolf, but was formerly the Owl. The Cut Bank Wolves and Lady Wolves have won a total of 41 state championships across seven different sports.

=== Basketball ===
==== Boys ====
Cut Bank Wolves basketball has won eight state championships in twelve state championship appearances since the first Montana High School Association (MHSA) boys' basketball championship in 1911. The team plays in Willie DeGroot Gymnasium, named after William "Willie" DeGroot, who led the basketball team to five divisional championships, three state championship appearances, and two state championship victories. All appearances took place when Cut Bank played in Class B basketball.

===== Championship appearances =====
Year	Opponent	Score
1937	Roundup	14–13
1938	Beaverhead	31–24
1957	Anaconda Central	60–54
1958	Red Lodge	52–78
1966	Chester	60–46
1989	Lodge Grass	83–91
1993	Columbus	57–46
1998	Malta	54–65
2000	Baker	47–65
2003	Manhattan	61–58
2005	Fairfield	54–50
2006	Roundup	69–39

==== Girls ====
Cut Bank Lady Wolves basketball has won no state championships. The team, since the first MHSA girls' basketball championship in 1972, has had one state championship appearance. All appearances took place when Cut Bank played in Class B basketball.

===== Championship appearances =====
Year	Opponent	Score
1980	Sweet Grass County	38–54

=== Cross country ===
==== Boys ====
Cut Bank Wolves cross country has won state twice, first in 1972 and most recently in 1993.

==== Girls ====
Lady Wolves cross country has won state twice, first in 1995 and most recently in 2001.

=== Football ===
Since the first MHSA football championship in 1900, Cut Bank has made the state championship eight times with a total of four wins and four losses. The team plays at Ron Kowalski Field; Kowalski was the coach of the Wolves during three of their four state championships.

==== Championship appearances ====
Year	Class	Opponent	Score
1973	A	Butte Central	6–27
1975	A	Park	9–14
1985	B	Roundup	35–6
1989	B	Choteau	18–7
1990	B	Lincoln County	28–8
1991	B	Troy	14–22
2000	B	Malta	7–20
2005	B	Fairfield	33–0

=== Golf ===
==== Boys ====
The Cut Bank boys golf team has won state four times. They won in 1984, 1991, 1992, and 1999.

==== Girls ====
The Cut Bank girls golf team has won state twice, first in 1986 and most recently 1988.

=== Tennis ===
==== Boys ====
The Wolves tennis team has eight state championships. Notably, they won all eight in a row, winning state every year from 2002 to 2009.

==== Girls ====
The Lady Wolves tennis team has one state championship. The team won state in 2011.

=== Track and field ===
==== Boys ====
The Wolves track and field team has two state championships. The team won state back-to-back, winning in 1990 and 1991.

==== Girls ====
The Lady Wolves track and field team has three state championships, winning state in 1988, 1989, and 2010.

=== Volleyball ===
Since 1984, the year the first MHSA volleyball championship took place, Cut Bank has not appeared in any state championships.

=== Wrestling ===
==== Boys ====
Wolves wrestling has won state five times. The team won in 1970, 1971, 1972, 1983, and 1984.

==== Girls ====
Lady Wolves wrestling has never won state.
