= Two Medicine River =

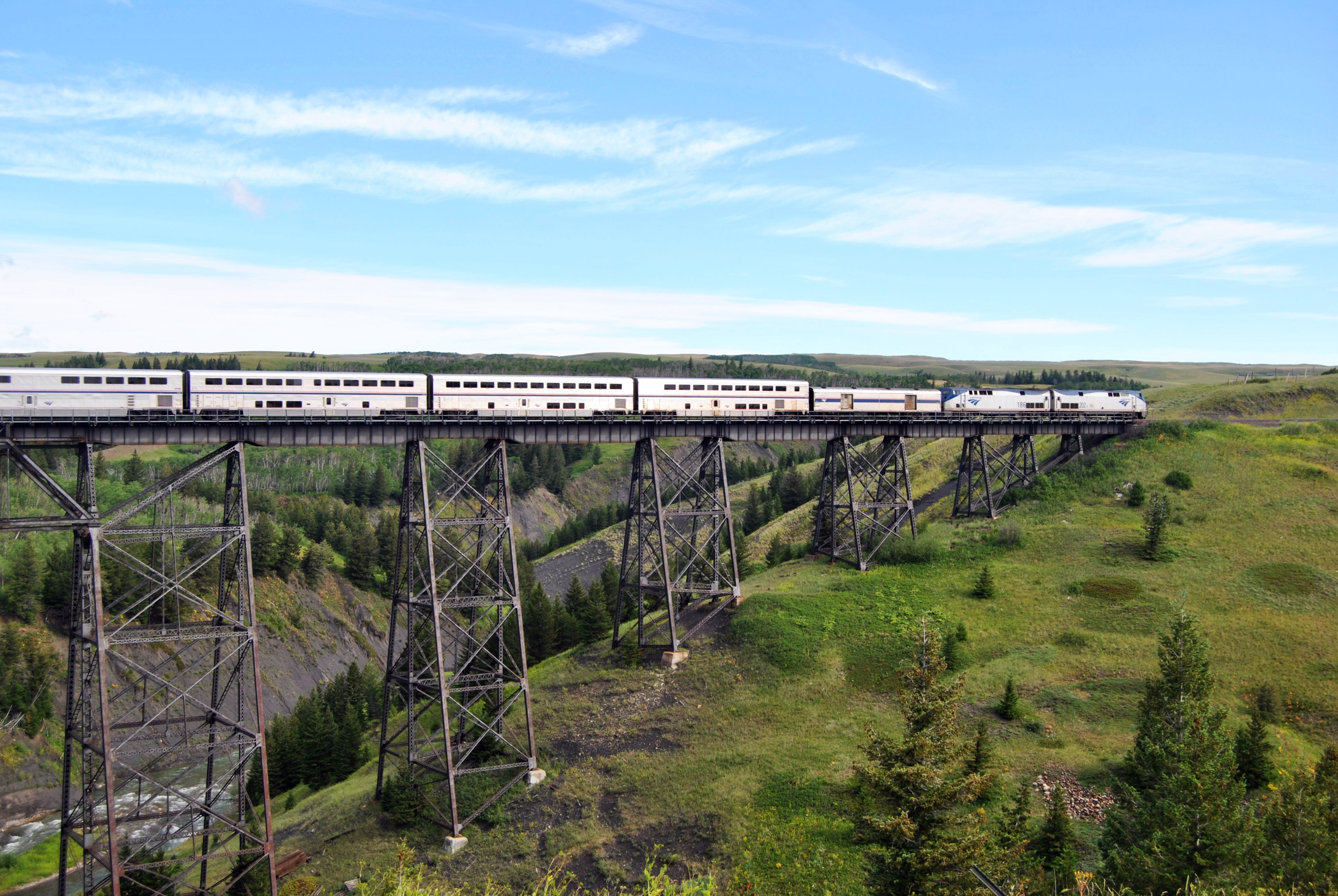
- Amtrak's Empire Builder crosses the Two Medicine River near East Glacier Park in 2011.

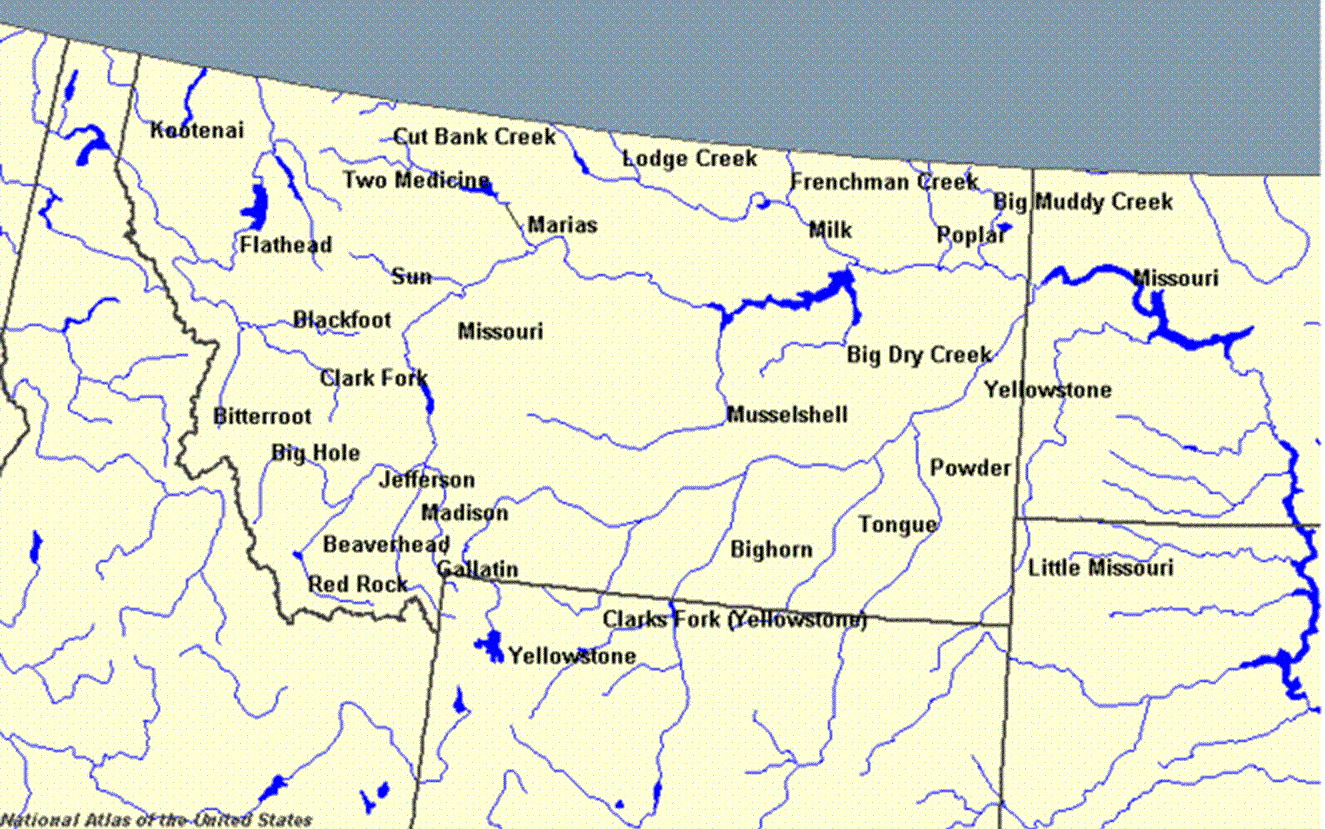
- Montana rivers with Two Medicine in the north central

Location
- Country: Pondera and Glacier County, Montana

Physical characteristics
- Source
  - coordinates: 48°29′32″N 113°15′49″W
- Mouth
  - coordinates: 48°29′11″N 112°13′40″W
  - elevation: 3,294 feet (1,004 m)
- Discharge
  - location: Browning
  - average: 375 cu ft/s (10.6 m^{3}/s)

Basin features
- River system: Missouri River

The Two Medicine River is a tributary of the Marias River, approximately 60 mi (97 km) long, in northwestern Montana in the United States.

It rises in the Rocky Mountain Front in Glacier National Park at the continental divide and flows east, down from the mountains and across the Blackfeet Indian Reservation. It receives Birch Creek in southeastern Glacier County and joins Cut Bank Creek to form the Marias, approximately 12 mi (19 km) southeast of Cut Bank.

== See also ==
- List of rivers of Montana
- Montana Stream Access Law
