= Cut Bank Creek =

The Cut Bank Creek
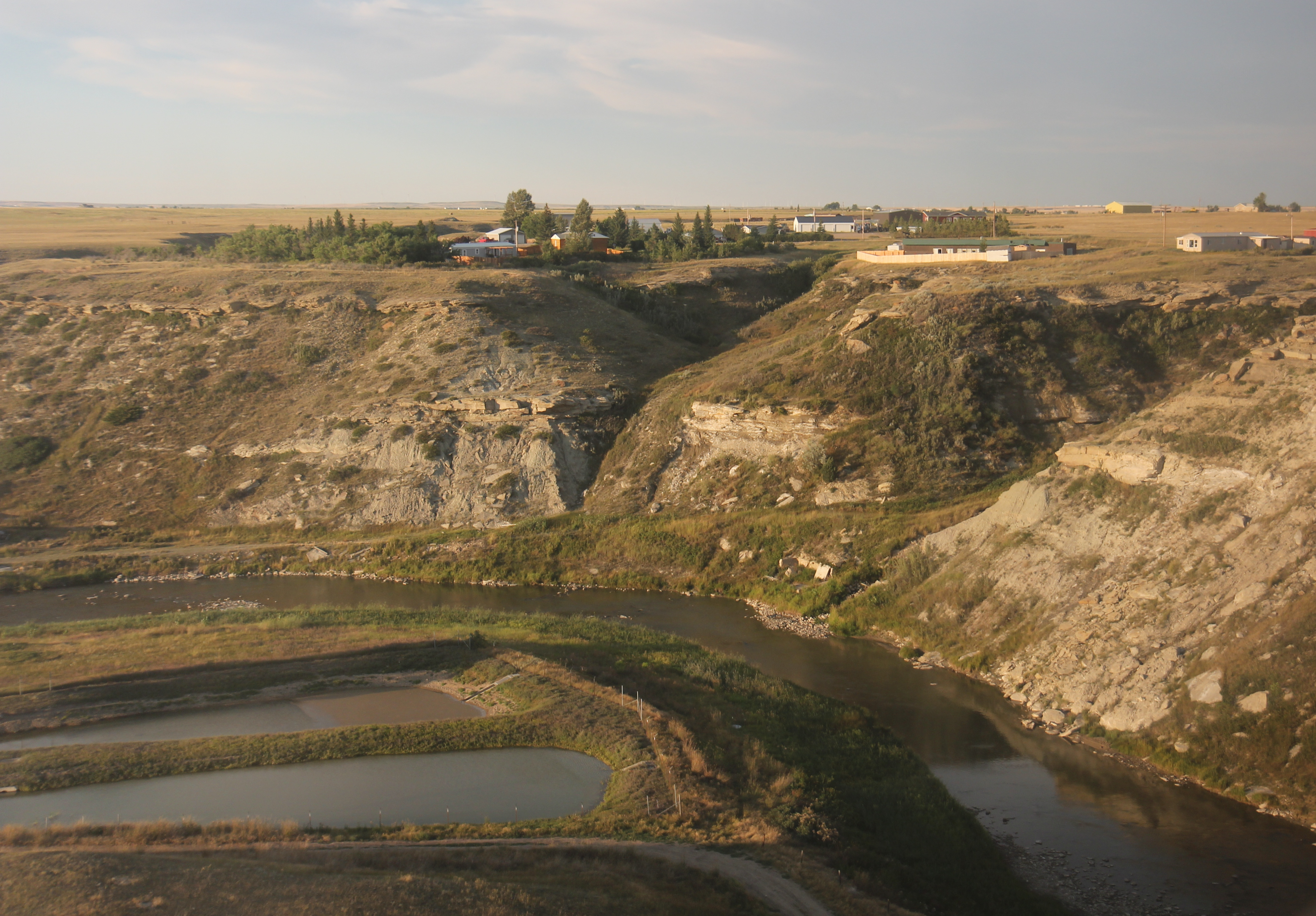
- The Cut Bank Creek at Cut Bank, Montana

Location
- Country: Glacier County, Montana

Physical characteristics
- Source
  - location: Pitamakan Lake, Mount Morgan(Montana)
  - coordinates: 48°31′09.1″N 113°27′34″W
- 2nd source
  - location: Mad Wolf Mountain
  - coordinates: 48°35′12.5″N 113°22′05.4″W
- Mouth
  - coordinates: 48°29′12″N 112°13′36″W
  - elevation: 3,294 feet (1,004 m)
- Discharge
  - location: Cut Bank
  - average: 179 cu ft/s (5.1 m^{3}/s)

Basin features
- River system: Missouri River

The Cut Bank Creek is a tributary of the Marias River in the Missouri River basin watershed, approximately 75 mi (123 km) long, in northwestern Montana in the United States, which having deeply eroded steep cliff banks eponymously gives name to the cut bank formal terrain term of geological science.

It rises in the Rocky Mountains in Glacier National Park at the continental divide and flows ENE onto the foothills and plains of the Blackfeet Indian Reservation, then southeast, past Cut Bank, Montana where it forms a scenic gorge 150 feet (46 m) deep spanned by an elevated railway bridge just a mile from the town's Amtrak rail transport system passenger station and BNSF railway freight yards. The river and cliff there are prototypical giving rise to the eponymous formally named "cut bank" geographic terrain feature archetype.

In southeastern Glacier County, approximately 12 mi (19 km) southeast of Cut Bank, it joins the Two Medicine River to form the Marias River.

There is a brewery in Cut Bank whose name is based on this creek.

== See also ==
- List of rivers of Montana
- Montana Stream Access Law
