= Cut Bank (film) =

- Theatrical release poster
- Directed by: Matt Shakman
- Written by: Roberto Patino
- Produced by: Mickey Barold; Dan Cohen; Edward Zwick; Laura Rister; Mark C. Manuel; Ted O'Neal
- Starring: Liam Hemsworth; Teresa Palmer; Billy Bob Thornton; Bruce Dern; Michael Stuhlbarg; Oliver Platt; John Malkovich
- Cinematography: Ben Richardson
- Edited by: Craig Wood
- Music by: James Newton Howard
- Production company: Kilburn Media
- Distributed by: A24
- Release dates: June 16, 2014 (LAFF); April 3, 2015
- Running time: 92 minutes
- Country: United States
- Language: English
- Budget: $5 million
- Box office: $288,591

Cut Bank (also known as Hell Town) is a 2014 American independent neo-Western neo-noir-thriller film directed by Matt Shakman (in his feature film debut) and written by Roberto Patino. Starring Liam Hemsworth, Teresa Palmer, Billy Bob Thornton, Bruce Dern, Michael Stuhlbarg, Oliver Platt, and John Malkovich, the film was selected to be screened in the Contemporary World Cinema section at the 2014 Toronto International Film Festival. The film follows a witness to a murder who wants to get rich off of what he saw. It was released in the United States on April 3, 2015, in a limited release and through video on demand by A24.

== Plot ==
As reclusive taxidermist Derby Milton looks out a window at his mailbox, local mail carrier Georgie Wits gathers up items for his route, including a decorative lunchbox addressed to Milton. Meanwhile, in a rapeseed field, Dwayne McLaren and his girlfriend Cassandra Steeley film a promotional spot for the town of Cut Bank, Montana, in preparation for Cassandra's upcoming performance in a local beauty pageant. As Dwayne films Cassandra, Georgie's mail truck comes into view. Georgie exits the truck and is approached by a large man who shoots him. Dwayne and Cassandra hide while he films the attack. The man fires a second shot into Georgie, picks up his body, and loads it into the mail truck.

Dwayne and Cassandra report what happened to her father Stan. Sheriff Vogel arrives and views the tape, which presents him with Cut Bank's first murder case. The next day, Dwayne leaves a copy of the video at the local post office, where the postmaster has filled out an application for Dwayne to receive the six-figure reward offered for providing evidence of violence against a postal worker. US Postal Inspector Joe Barrett arrives in Cut Bank to inspect the body and confirm the reward for Dwayne. Georgie's murderer destroys the mail truck and puts the undelivered mail in a storage container, including the parcel for Milton. At a trailer in a junkyard, where Georgie is hiding, he pays the man, who is a mute Native American named Match.

Milton inquires at the post office about his parcel. When informed about Georgie's murder, he visits the scene of the crime and notes the large boot print left at the scene. He visits a local shoe store and identifies Match as the source of the print. Milton drives to Match's home and asks for his mail. Match refuses to answer, they fight, and Milton kills Match.

Dwayne visits Georgie at the trailer. As Dwayne explains that Georgie needs to provide no evidence of his presence here, it becomes clear Dwayne and Georgie have staged Georgie's murder and plan to divide the reward money. Stan discovers Georgie hiding underneath the trailer. Georgie attacks Stan with bolt cutters and hides his body in the back of a van on the lot.

Milton tracks down Georgie and confronts him about the mail. He viciously murders Georgie with a crowbar. When the police arrive to process the murder scene, they are stunned to find Stan alive in the back of the van. As Stan recovers, Dwayne realizes that someone has figured out his scheme. He and Cassandra decide to leave Cut Bank immediately after the pageant.

Having figured out Dwayne's role in the scheme, Milton confronts him at the pageant. Dwayne races home and retrieves a rifle, but Milton has already unloaded it. Milton holds him at gunpoint and reveals himself to be an old friend of Dwayne's disabled father who has been protecting animals since he was forced to kill a family of bears, but this has involved murdering people as well, particularly poachers. At the same time, Vogel, investigating an earlier incident with Milton, discovers that Milton has created himself a model family in his basement based on a painting, but the mother lacks the decorative lunchbox from the painting, explaining Milton's obsessive hunt for it. When Cassandra arrives after winning the pageant, Milton takes her hostage too. Dwayne drives Milton to the storage unit. He uses the cap of his Copenhagen to scratch "911" into the driver's side door, hoping the security officer will notice it. Inside the storage unit, Milton quickly finds his parcel and thanks Dwayne for helping him.

When he notices Dwayne's "911" message, however, he places two large envelopes over Dwayne and Cassandra's heads, seals them with duct tape, and locks the storage unit. At the security gate, he is preparing to shoot the guard when Sheriff Vogel calls for Milton to come out of the vehicle. Milton drives towards Vogel instead, shooting as he goes. Vogel shoots and kills Milton, who crashes into a tree. Vogel rescues Dwayne and Cassandra.

Having worked out the entire scheme, Vogel and the recovering Stan summon Dwayne to the morgue. Vogel has Dwayne put a bulletproof vest underneath Georgie's corpse as he puts a silencer on his gun. He explains to Dwayne that he shouldn't wait around for a lucky break before he leaves town to find a new life. Vogel and Stan agree to cover up Dwayne's scheme, but in return he has to forfeit the reward money and never tell Cassandra what they did. The two men promise to look after his father and Stan provides Dwayne with some money to help him start a new life. Vogel shoots Georgie's corpse twice, and then presents the body to Inspector Barrett. Dwayne and Cassandra drive out of town on their way to Los Angeles.

== Cast ==
- Liam Hemsworth as Dwayne McLaren
- Teresa Palmer as Cassandra Steeley
- Billy Bob Thornton as Stan Steeley
- Bruce Dern as Georgie Wits
- Michael Stuhlbarg as Derby Milton
- Oliver Platt as Joe Barrett
- John Malkovich as Sheriff Vogel
- David Burke as Match
- Sonya Salomaa as Gretchen
- Christian Distefano as Wyatt
- Peyton Kennedy as Rosie
- Graem Beddoes as Chance Stable

== Production ==
On June 14, 2013, Variety announced that the film's shooting began in Edmonton, Alberta, Canada. One location in Edmonton was Eastglen High School. Another was Duggan's Boundary Irish Pub.

== Release ==
The film had its world premiere at the Los Angeles Film Festival on June 16, 2014. Shortly after the premiere, it was announced that A24 and DirecTV had acquired distribution rights to the film. It was screened in Canada at the Toronto International Film Festival on September 10, 2014, and at the Edmonton Film Festival on September 26, 2014. The film had its overseas debut at the Zurich Film Festival on October 4, 2014.

The film was released on DirecTV Cinema on February 26, 2015, two months before its limited release (including video on demand) in the United States on April 3, 2015. A week later on April 10, the film appeared in a limited release in Canada, and was made available to Canadian video on demand that same day. It went on to premiere at the Palm Beach International Film Festival on March 29, 2015, the Chattanooga Film Festival on April 2, 2015, and the RiverRun Film Festival on April 19, 2015.

=== Home media ===
The film was distributed on DVD and Blu-ray in the United States on May 26, 2015, by Lionsgate Home Entertainment.

== Reception ==
Reviews at the premiere were mixed. Rotten Tomatoes, a review aggregator, reports that 37% of 38 surveyed critics gave the film a positive review; the average rating is 4.8/10. The site's consensus reads: "Cut Bank contains typically outstanding work from its solid veteran cast, but it's lost in a dull morass of predictably derivative crime thriller clichés." Metacritic rated it 44/100 based on 12 reviews, indicating "mixed or average" reviews.

Geoff Berkshire of Variety wrote, "A strong supporting cast, including Bruce Dern, steals the show in otherwise routine thriller." Todd McCarthy of The Hollywood Reporter called it a "copycat, self-consciously comedic violent noir" in the style of the Coen Brothers and Quentin Tarantino.
