= Cut Bank station =

Railway station in Cut Bank, Montana, United States

Cut Bank, MT
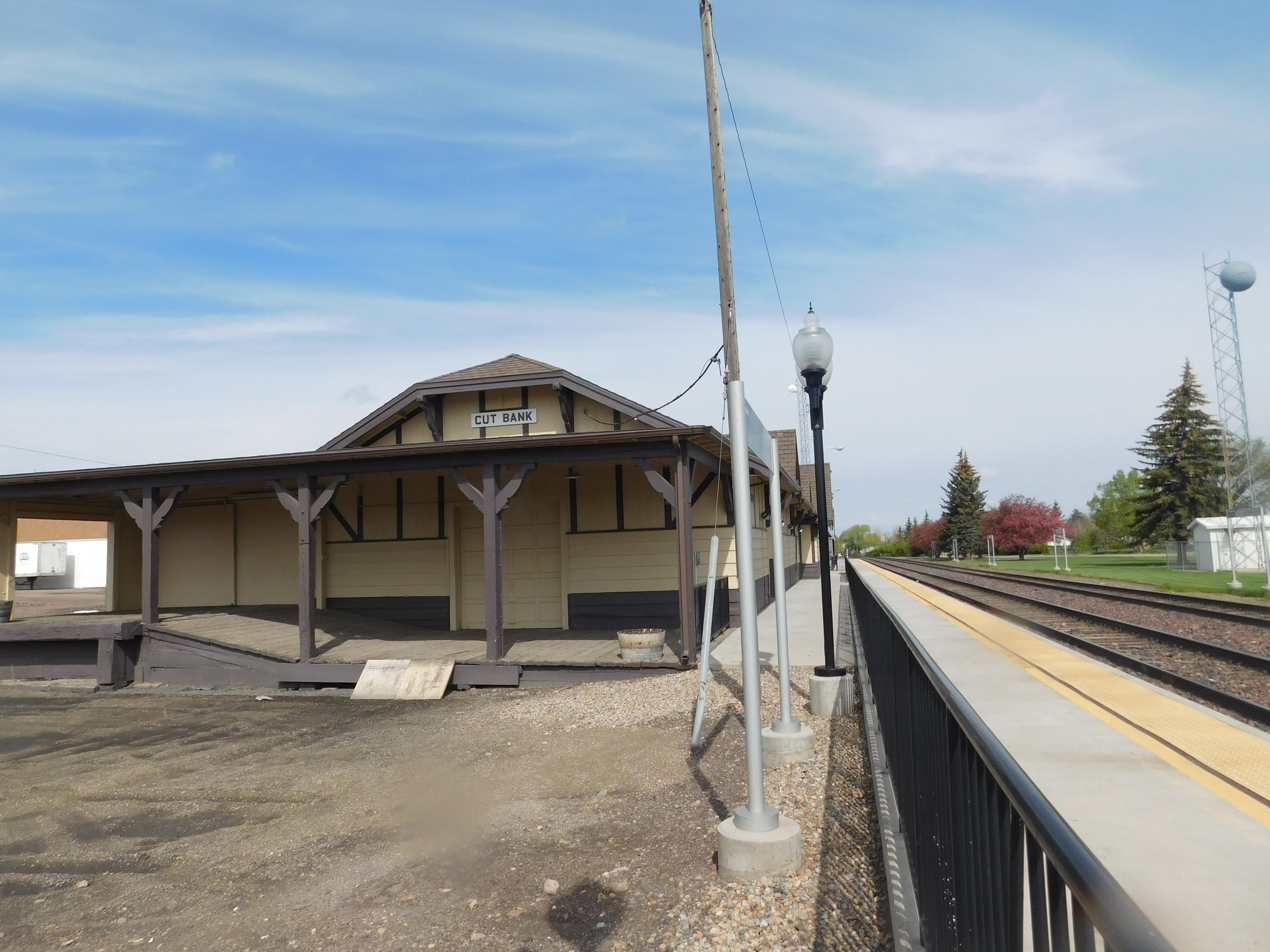
- Cut Bank station in May 2017

General information
- Location: 101 BNSF Industrial Site; Cut Bank, Montana; United States
- Coordinates: 48.63839°N 112.33153°W
- Owner: BNSF Railway
- Line: BNSF Hi Line Subdivision
- Platforms: 1 side platform
- Tracks: 2

Construction
- Parking: Yes
- Accessible: Yes

Other information
- Station code: Amtrak: CUT

History
- Opened: June 18, 1893
- Rebuilt: c. 1918; December 15, 1939

Passengers
- FY 2025: 1,257 (Amtrak)

Services
Preceding station	Amtrak	Following station
East Glacier Park (April–October) toward Seattle or Portland	Empire Builder	Shelby toward Chicago
Browning (October–April) toward Seattle or Portland	Empire Builder	Shelby toward Chicago
Former services
Preceding station	Great Northern Railway	Following station
Gunsight toward Seattle	Main Line	Baltic toward St. Paul
Location

Cut Bank station is a train station in Cut Bank, Montana, served by the Amtrak Empire Builder. The station was built by the Great Northern Railway around 1918. The railroad renovated the station in 1939. The building exterior was restored in 2010. Amtrak constructed a new 762-foot (232 m)-long platform in 2011.
