= Cut Bank, Montana =

City in Montana, United States

Cut Bank
- City
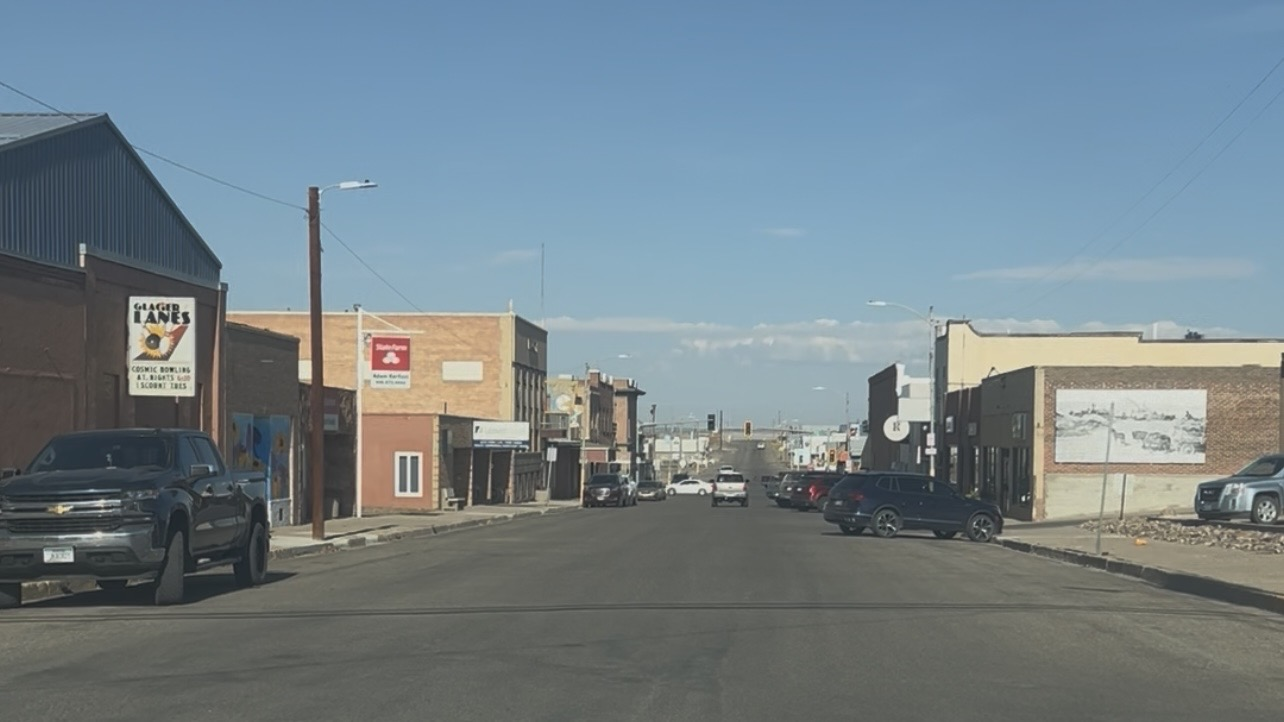

- Location of Cut Bank, Montana

- Location in the United States
- Coordinates: 48°37′45″N 112°19′46″W
- Country: United States
- State: Montana
- County: Glacier

Area
  - Total: 1.16 sq mi (3.01 km^{2})
  - Land: 1.16 sq mi (3.00 km^{2})
  - Water: 0.0039 sq mi (0.01 km^{2})
- Elevation: 3,773 ft (1,150 m)

Population (2020)
  - Total: 3,056
  - Density: 2,642.0/sq mi (1,020.07/km^{2})
- Time zone: UTC−7 (Mountain (MST))
  - Summer (DST): UTC−6 (MDT)
- ZIP code: 59427
- Area code: 406
- FIPS code: 30-18775
- GNIS feature ID: 2410281
- Website: www.cityofcutbank.org

Cut Bank is a city in and the county seat of Glacier County, Montana, United States, located just east of the "cut bank" (gorge) along Cut Bank Creek. The population was 3,056 at the 2020 census. The town was founded in 1891 with the arrival of the Great Northern Railway.

== Geography ==
Cut Bank is located in eastern Glacier County. The Blackfeet Indian Reservation is located just west of Cut Bank, on the western side of Cut Bank Creek.

According to the United States Census Bureau, the city has a total area of 0.99 square miles (2.56 km^{2}), all land.

The city is located 30 miles (48 km) south of the Canada–United States border. The name of the city comes from the cut bank (gorge) — a scenic hazard to navigation and a geologic feature of the same name. The Cut Bank Creek river is spanned cliff to cliff by a scenic elevated railway bridge high above the canyon floor less than a mile from the edge of the town.

=== Climate ===
Cut Bank experiences a semi-arid climate (Köppen BSk), with long, cold, dry winters and short, warm, wetter summers. In winter, bitterly cold arctic air masses move south and impact the eastern side of the American Continental Divide. During such invasions, Cut Bank, with its comparatively high elevation and topography, is frequently the coldest location in the lower 48 U.S. States. Being close to the eastern slopes of the Rocky Mountains also makes the area subject to occasional Chinook winds that can rapidly increase the local temperature.

Climate data for Cut Bank, Montana (Cut Bank Municipal Airport), 1991–2020 normals, extremes 1903–present
Month	Jan	Feb	Mar	Apr	May	Jun	Jul	Aug	Sep	Oct	Nov	Dec	Year
Record high °F (°C)	67 (19)	71 (22)	77 (25)	87 (31)	91 (33)	101 (38)	106 (41)	107 (42)	97 (36)	88 (31)	79 (26)	67 (19)	107 (42)
Mean maximum °F (°C)	54.8 (12.7)	54.7 (12.6)	62.5 (16.9)	72.1 (22.3)	80.4 (26.9)	85.5 (29.7)	93.1 (33.9)	93.3 (34.1)	88.0 (31.1)	76.2 (24.6)	61.9 (16.6)	53.7 (12.1)	95.3 (35.2)
Mean daily maximum °F (°C)	32.3 (0.2)	34.2 (1.2)	42.6 (5.9)	52.3 (11.3)	62.3 (16.8)	70.4 (21.3)	80.2 (26.8)	79.7 (26.5)	68.7 (20.4)	54.4 (12.4)	41.0 (5.0)	32.9 (0.5)	54.2 (12.3)
Daily mean °F (°C)	21.8 (−5.7)	23.1 (−4.9)	31.1 (−0.5)	40.2 (4.6)	49.6 (9.8)	57.6 (14.2)	64.9 (18.3)	63.9 (17.7)	54.4 (12.4)	42.0 (5.6)	30.6 (−0.8)	22.8 (−5.1)	41.8 (5.4)
Mean daily minimum °F (°C)	11.3 (−11.5)	12.0 (−11.1)	19.7 (−6.8)	28.1 (−2.2)	37.0 (2.8)	44.7 (7.1)	49.6 (9.8)	48.0 (8.9)	40.1 (4.5)	29.7 (−1.3)	20.2 (−6.6)	12.6 (−10.8)	29.4 (−1.4)
Mean minimum °F (°C)	−18.9 (−28.3)	−14.0 (−25.6)	−5.6 (−20.9)	11.6 (−11.3)	23.4 (−4.8)	34.8 (1.6)	39.5 (4.2)	37.2 (2.9)	25.7 (−3.5)	9.1 (−12.7)	−6.8 (−21.6)	−15.3 (−26.3)	−28.8 (−33.8)
Record low °F (°C)	−46 (−43)	−47 (−44)	−34 (−37)	−25 (−32)	9 (−13)	21 (−6)	32 (0)	25 (−4)	−4 (−20)	−14 (−26)	−33 (−36)	−46 (−43)	−47 (−44)
Average precipitation inches (mm)	0.22 (5.6)	0.23 (5.8)	0.36 (9.1)	0.95 (24)	1.65 (42)	2.73 (69)	1.29 (33)	0.96 (24)	1.08 (27)	0.57 (14)	0.42 (11)	0.31 (7.9)	10.77 (274)
Average snowfall inches (cm)	4.0 (10)	4.1 (10)	6.8 (17)	3.9 (9.9)	1.2 (3.0)	0.0 (0.0)	0.0 (0.0)	0.0 (0.0)	0.4 (1.0)	3.0 (7.6)	5.6 (14)	4.4 (11)	33.4 (83.5)
Average precipitation days (≥ 0.01 in)	4.2	4.2	5.9	7.9	9.8	11.3	6.7	6.1	6.5	5.1	4.8	4.2	76.7
Average snowy days (≥ 0.1 in)	4.9	4.8	7.0	3.2	0.9	0.0	0.0	0.0	0.5	2.5	4.5	5.2	33.5
Source: NOAA (snow, snow days 1981–2010)

== Demographics ==
Historical population
Census	Pop.	Note	%±
1900	43		—
1910	500		1,062.8%
1920	1,181		136.2%
1930	845		−28.5%
1940	2,509		196.9%
1950	3,721		48.3%
1960	4,539		22.0%
1970	4,004		−11.8%
1980	3,688		−7.9%
1990	3,329		−9.7%
2000	3,105		−6.7%
2010	2,869		−7.6%
2020	3,056		6.5%
source: U.S. Decennial Census

=== 2020 census ===
As of the 2020 census, Cut Bank had a population of 3,056. The median age was 37.6 years. 26.5% of residents were under the age of 18 and 15.9% of residents were 65 years of age or older. For every 100 females there were 93.7 males, and for every 100 females age 18 and over there were 91.9 males age 18 and over.

0.0% of residents lived in urban areas, while 100.0% lived in rural areas.

There were 1,283 households in Cut Bank, of which 30.0% had children under the age of 18 living in them. Of all households, 39.4% were married-couple households, 23.3% were households with a male householder and no spouse or partner present, and 30.4% were households with a female householder and no spouse or partner present. About 36.8% of all households were made up of individuals and 14.5% had someone living alone who was 65 years of age or older.

There were 1,507 housing units, of which 14.9% were vacant. The homeowner vacancy rate was 3.1% and the rental vacancy rate was 12.5%.

Racial composition as of the 2020 census
Race	Number	Percent
White	1,764	57.7%
Black or African American	8	0.3%
American Indian and Alaska Native	872	28.5%
Asian	28	0.9%
Native Hawaiian and Other Pacific Islander	7	0.2%
Some other race	11	0.4%
Two or more races	366	12.0%
Hispanic or Latino (of any race)	81	2.7%

=== 2010 census ===
As of the 2010 census, there were 2,869 people, 1,249 households and 739 families residing in the city. The population density was 2,927 inhabitants per square mile (1,130.1/km^{2}). There were 1,441 housing units at an average density of 1,470 per square mile (567.6/km^{2}). The racial makeup of the city was 74.7% White, 0.2% African American, 19.0% Native American, 0.5% Asian, 0.4% from other races, and 5.2% from two or more races. Hispanic or Latino of any race were 2.5% of the population.

There were 1,249 households, of which 30.3% had children under the age of 18 living with them, 43.4% were married couples living together, 10.6% had a female householder with no husband present, 5.1% had a male householder with no wife present, and 40.8% were non-families. 35.7% of all households were made up of individuals, and 14.6% had someone living alone who was 65 years of age or older. The average household size was 2.26 and the average family size was 2.94.

The median age was 41.2 years. 24.4% of residents were under the age of 18; 7.7% were between the ages of 18 and 24; 22.4% were from 25 to 44; 28.8% were from 45 to 64; and 16.8% were 65 years of age or older. The gender makeup of the city was 48.2% male and 51.8% female.

== Education ==
The area school district is Cut Bank Public Schools, with its components being Cut Bank Elementary School District and Cut Bank High School District. Cut Bank Public Schools educates students from kindergarten through 12th grade. Cut Bank High School's team name is the Wolves.

Cut Bank has a public library, the Glacier County Library.

== Media ==
The Cut Bank Pioneer Press is a newspaper that provides both print and e-edition news.

== Transportation ==
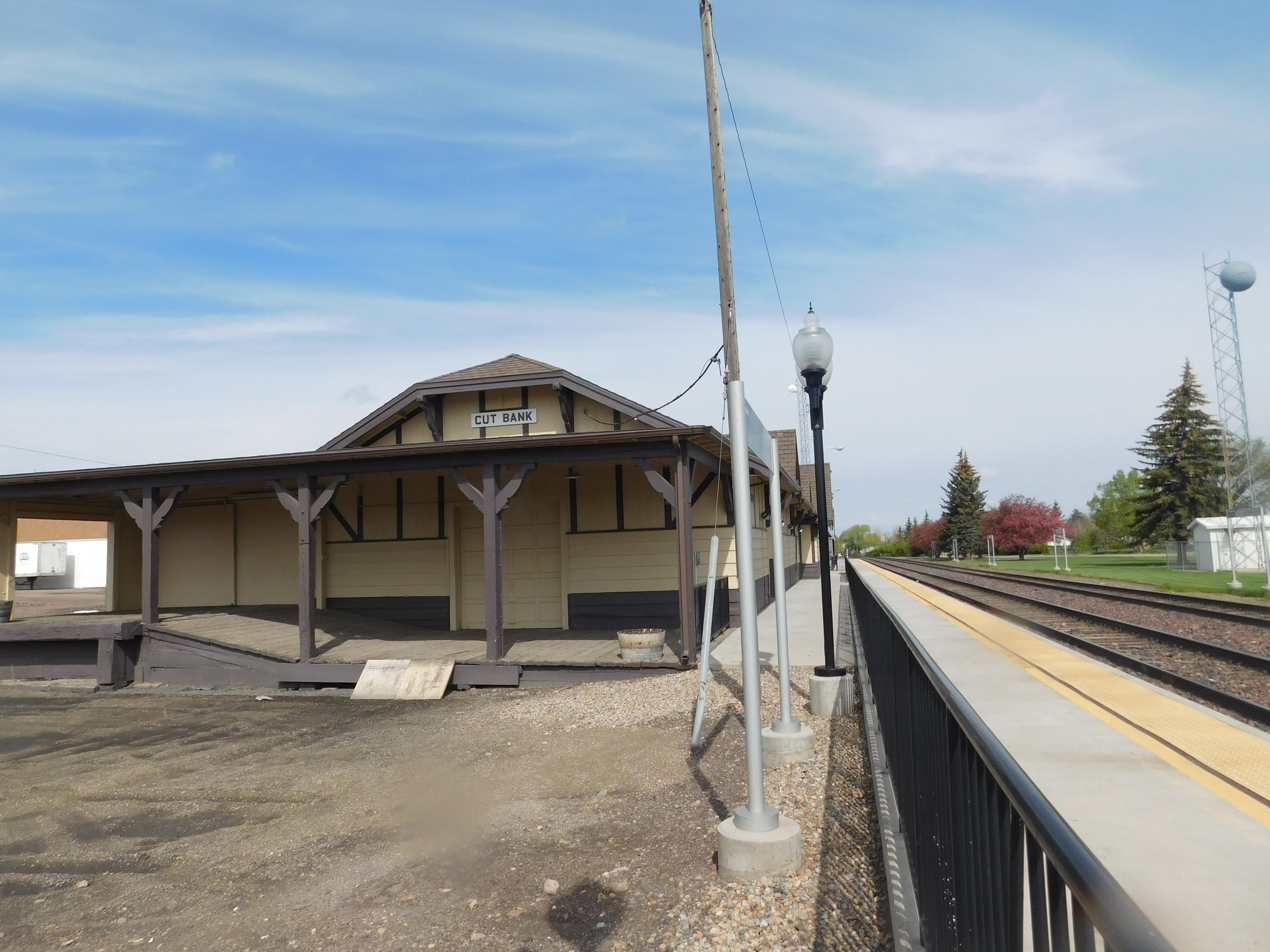
Amtrak station in Cut Bank

Cut Bank is served by Amtrak's Empire Builder long-distance train on its route from Chicago to Seattle/Portland. There is one eastbound and one westbound train per day.

A train of the same name served the city under Amtrak's predecessor, the Great Northern Railway. The city, in conjunction with Amtrak and the current track owner BNSF Railway, recently repainted its historic train station in the traditional Great Northern depot colors.

The city contains an important railroad freight yard operated by the BNSF.

Cut Bank Municipal Airport is a public use airport 3 miles (4.8 km) southwest of Cut Bank.

U.S. Route 2 passes through the city as Main Street, leading east 22 miles (35 km) to Interstate 15 at Shelby and west 34 miles (55 km) to Browning.

== Cut Bank Penguin ==
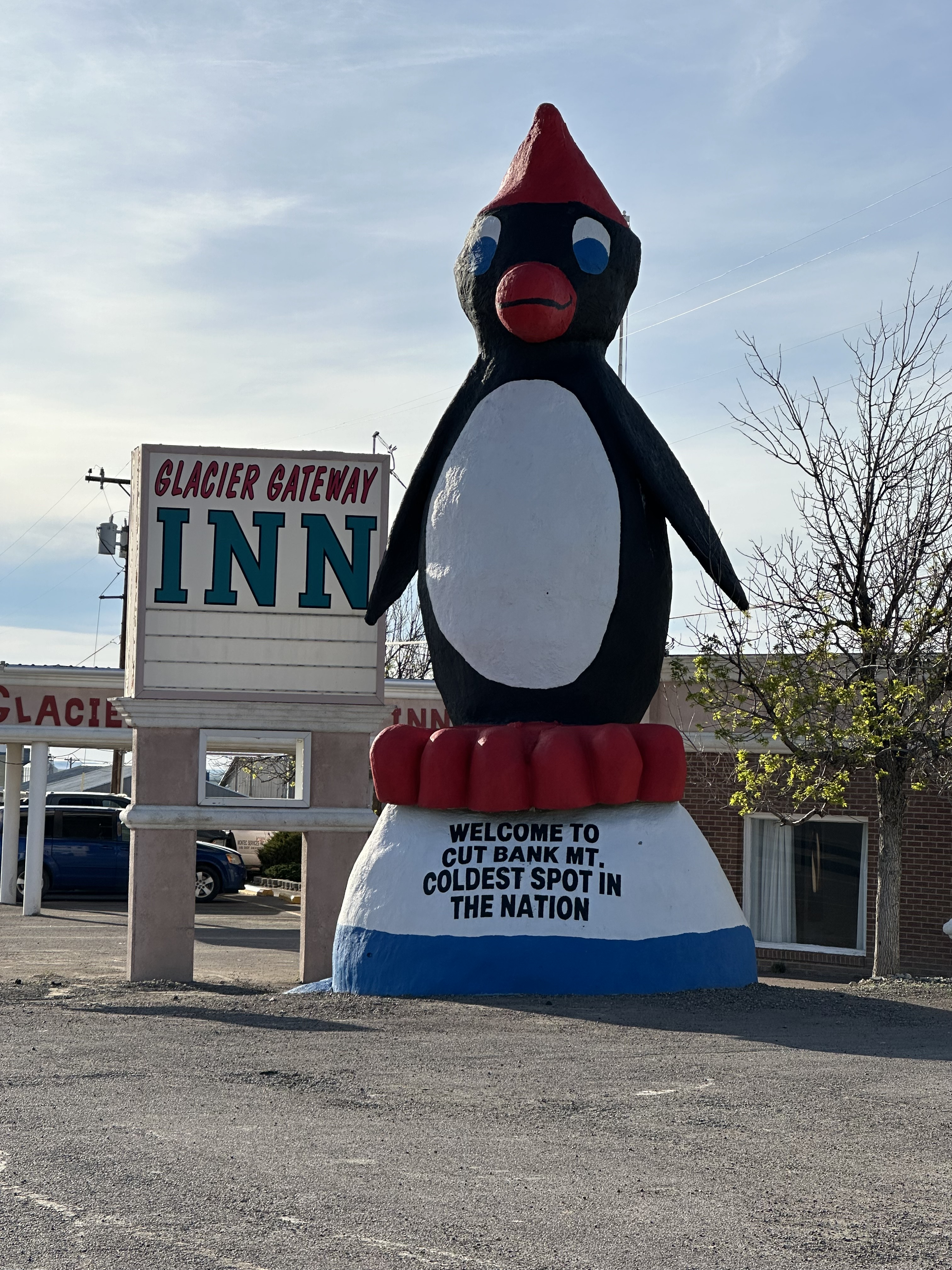
Cut Bank Penguin

Cut Bank is home to the world's largest statue of a penguin. The statue is of a penguin on an iceberg with the text "Welcome to Cut Bank MT, Coldest Spot in the Nation".

== Notable people ==
- Gerard Jones, comic book writer, born in Cut Bank
- Rosalie Mae Jones/Daystar, choreographer and dancer, founder of Daystar Contemporary Dance-Drama of Indian America
- James C. Nelson, Montana Supreme Court justice
- Jordan Peccia, Engineering professor at Yale University
- Rob Quist, musician
- Glenn Roush, Montana state legislator
- Hart Merriam Schultz, American Indian artist
- Gloria Jean Siebrecht, amateur paleontologist
- Alexis Wineman, Miss Montana 2012
- Danielle Wineman, Miss Montana 2015

== See also ==
- Cut Bank (film), which takes place in Cut Bank
- Cut Bank station
- Glacier County Courthouse
