= KBWG =

- Browning, Montana; United States
- Frequency: 89.7 MHz
- Branding: Thunder Radio

Programming
- Format: Variety

Ownership
- Owner: Blackfeet Tribe

History
- First air date: November 20, 2010
- Former call signs: KBWG-LP (2010–2024)
- Former frequencies: 107.5 MHz (2010–2024)
- Call sign meaning: "Browning"

Technical information
- Licensing authority: FCC
- Facility ID: 763408
- Class: A
- ERP: 1,250 watts
- HAAT: 127 meters (417 ft)
- Transmitter coordinates: 48°42′22.7″N 113°6′1.2″W

Links
- Public license information: Public file; LMS
- Website: KBWG on Facebook

KBWG (89.7 MHz), known as Thunder Radio, is a radio station in Browning, Montana, United States, owned by the Blackfeet Tribe.

The station began as KBWG-LP 107.5, a low-power FM radio station, in 2004. It was owned by the town of Browning and initially broadcast emergency and weather information before the town received a grant in 2006 to upgrade the facility. It then began broadcasting classic country music. In 2010 and 2011, the station began broadcasting with live DJs and local news and sports programming, adopting the name Thunder Radio. By 2015, the station had more than two dozen volunteers.

The station temporarily shut down on January 14, 2016, amid the closure of City Hall and a dispute between the town of Browning and the Blackfeet Tribal Business Council and discussions of a possible municipal bankruptcy filing for Browning. By March 2017, the town was in receivership, and Glacier County was evaluating spinning Thunder Radio off to a community board. The Blackfeet Tribe was owed $2.6 million by the town of Browning, and as part of a court-ordered settlement agreement in which the tribe acquired most of the town's assets, KBWG-LP was included.

The Blackfeet Tribe obtained a full-power license and replaced KBWG-LP with KBWG on 89.7 MHz in 2024. The tribe also holds the licenses for four other full-power stations on the reservation: KIYO 88.1 in St. Mary, KWRR 90.3 in Heart Butte, KIPP 90.7 in East Glacier Park Village, and KEOP 90.7 in Little Browning. These stations were on the air with Thunder Radio's programming by February 2025 and were built as part of a partnership with the University of Montana that also saw Montana Public Radio add a transmitter—KUFB 88.9—in Browning.

== Simulcasts ==
Repeaters of KBWG
Call sign	Frequency	City of license	FID	ERP (W)	HAAT	Class	Transmitter coordinates	FCC info
KIYO	88.1 FM	St. Mary, Montana	763578	750	427 m (1,401 ft)	C3	48°40′7.8″N 113°23′10.7″W	LMS
KWRR	90.3 FM	Heart Butte, Montana	763582	250	103 m (338 ft)	A	48°18′1.6″N 112°52′46.4″W	LMS
KIPP	90.7 FM	East Glacier Park Village, Montana	763579	100	98 m (322 ft)	A	48°29′4.9″N 113°11′15.5″W	LMS
KEOP	90.7 FM	Little Browning, Montana	763581	100	2 m (6.6 ft)	A	48°37′40.3″N 112°20′52.6″W	LMS
