= Glendale Colony =

Glendale Colony may refer to:

- Glendale Colony, Montana
- Glendale Colony, South Dakota
