= Earl Old Person =

Blackfeet tribal leader (1929–2021)

Chief Earl Old Person
- Stu Sapoo, Ahka Pa Ka Pee
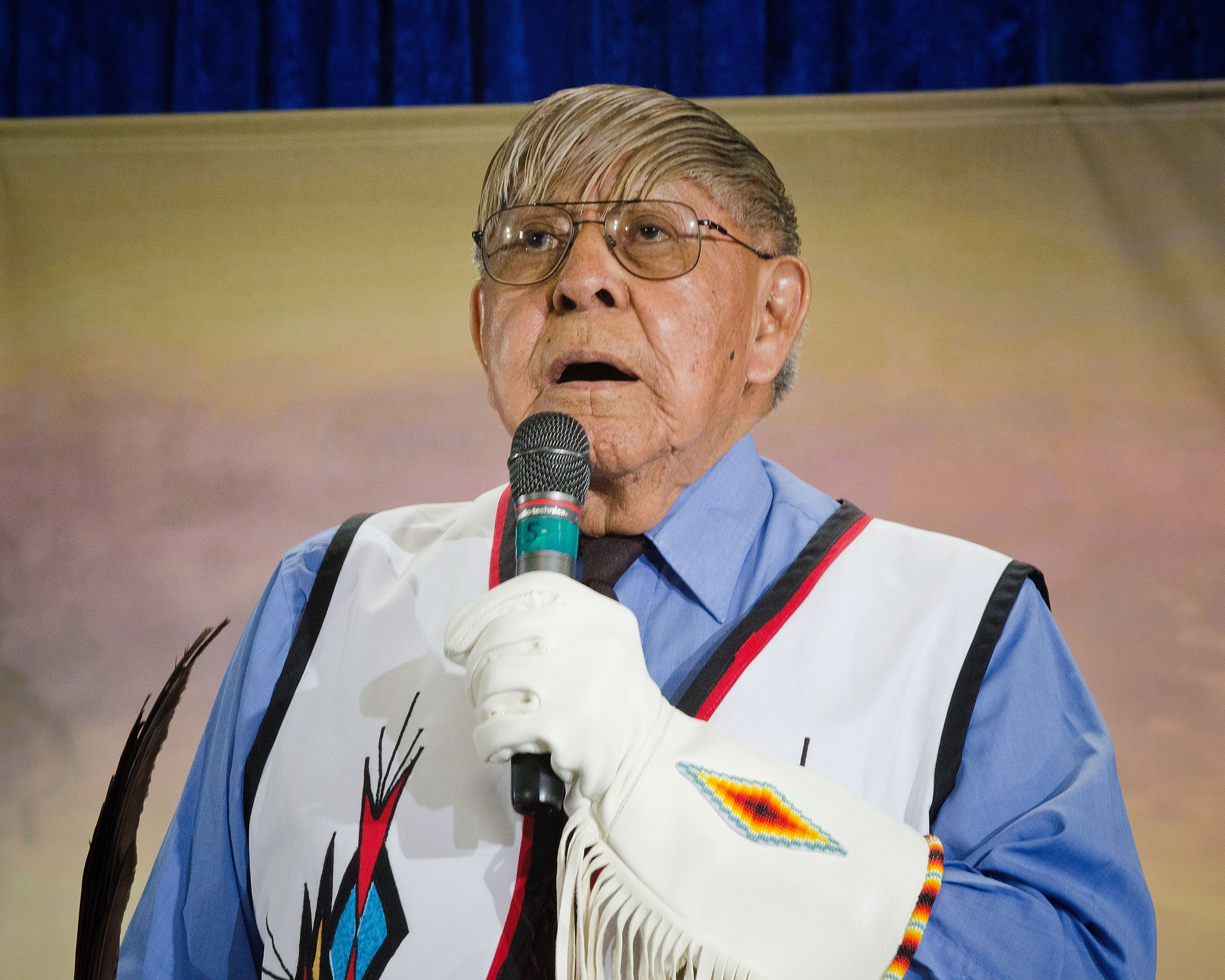
- Earl Old Person in 2012
- Born: April 13, 1929; Starr School, Montana, US
- Died: October 13, 2021 (aged 92); Browning, Montana, US
- Citizenship: Blackfeet
- Occupation: Tribal leader
- Years active: 1954–2021
- Known for: Honorary lifetime Chief of the Blackfeet Nation

Earl Old Person (Blackfeet names Stu Sapoo, "Cold Wind", and Ahka Pa Ka Pee, "Charging Home"; April 13, 1929 – October 13, 2021) was an American Indian political leader and the honorary lifetime chief of the Blackfeet Nation (Amskapi’Piikáni) in Montana, United States.

== Early years ==
Born on April 13, 1929, on his family's land, known as Grease Wood, near Starr School, Montana on the Blackfeet Indian Reservation, Earl Old Person was a full-blooded member of the Blackfeet tribe, the son of Juniper and Molly Old Person. He was raised along with many siblings. He went to elementary school in the community of Starr School, Montana, and graduated in 1947 from Browning High School in Browning, Montana. He credited his success in life to his parents, who continually encouraged him to try hard and to excel in school. He was raised in a traditional manner, of the last generation to speak the Blackfoot language as his first language, only learning English when he reached elementary school. He learned many traditional Blackfeet stories, songs, and dances, his memory helping preserve the Blackfeet culture decades later. "He had this, kind of, genius-type ability to hear Indian music and store that in his mind, and just hear it once."

His family said that each day his parents greeted their children with the words "IItahmiskinatoonii niipowaht iikakiima", meaning "good morning, get up, try hard", or "Jump up! Try!" His childhood home lacked central heat and indoor plumbing, but he lived within what remained of the horse culture of the Blackfeet people. "I grew up on horseback; always bareback, I never used a saddle. I spent a lot of time around livestock."

His musical skill and dancing ability led to public performances. In 1936, when he was only seven years old, the Browning High School basketball team earned its first trip to the state tournament in Great Falls and Old Person performed at halftime. At age nine, he traveled to Cleveland and New York City for six weeks, where he performed traditional Blackfeet song and dance at schools, colleges and civic organizations as part of an effort to raise funds to build a new church on the reservation.

As a teenager, he played basketball for Browning High School, keeping his long braids in spite of pushback from his coaches and harassment from opposing players. He said of the experience, "I had fun over it." A highlight of his teen years was a 1947 trip to Moisson, France, to attend the 6th World Scout Jamboree, where out of over 24,000 participants, he was the only Native American in attendance. He brought his father's tepee and set it up as his campsite.

== Leadership career ==
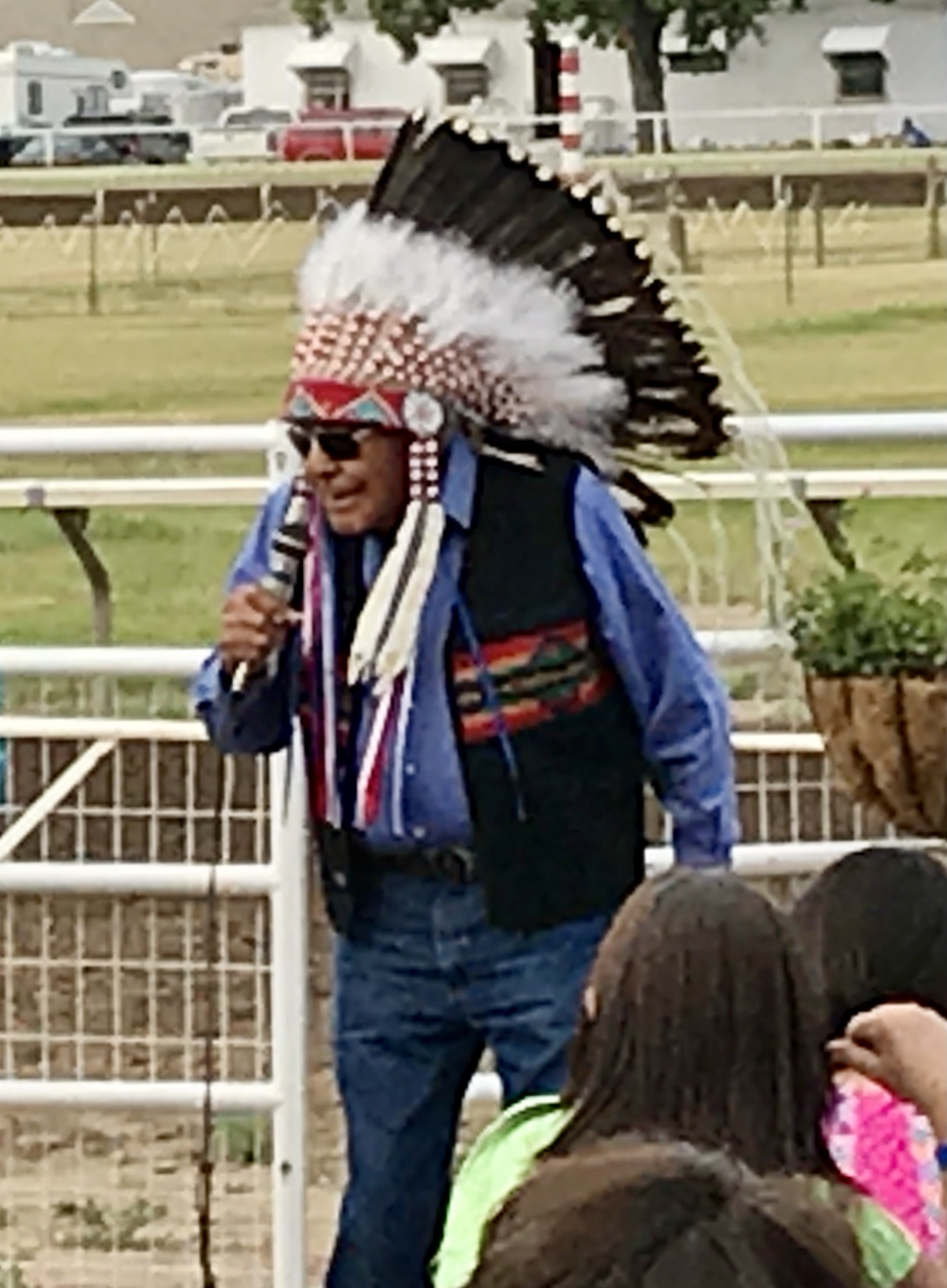
Earl Old Person at Montana ExpoPark in 2018, wearing the traditional headdress granted to him many years earlier when he was inducted into the Kainai Chieftainship.

In 1950, Old Person got a job in the tribe's land office, where one of his jobs was to be an interpreter for Blackfeet people who did not understand or speak English. At the time, only about one-fifth of the Blackfeet tribal members were considered full-blooded, and the tribe, like many others, was viewed as a candidate for termination.

in our Indian language the only translation for termination is to "wipe out" or "kill off"... how can we plan our future when the Indian Bureau threatens to wipe us out as a race? It is like trying to cook a meal in your tipi when someone is standing outside trying to burn the tipi down.

— Earl Old Person, 1960, speaking for the National Congress of American Indians against US plans for tribal termination.

Old Person was encouraged by tribal elders to enter politics, and was elected in 1954 to his first term as a member of his tribe's governing body, the Blackfeet Tribal Business Council, as the youngest person ever elected to the post. He was first elected tribal chairman in 1964 and served as chair for 16 of the subsequent 22 two-year terms between 1964 and 2008. He continued as a member of the tribal council until he retired in 2016, serving in elected office longer than any other elected official in Montana history. He was also the longest-serving elected tribal official in America.

In July 1978, Old Person was appointed honorary lifetime Chief of the Blackfeet Nation. He considered this the greatest honor ever bestowed upon him. The last principal chief of the Blackfeet Nation, White Calf, had died in Washington, D.C., in 1903. His son, James White Calf, born about 1858, succeeded to the title and lived to be well over 100, dying in 1970. Several years later, the family of James White Calf formally bestowed the tribal chieftainship upon Old Person. He also was inducted into the 40-member honorary Kainai Chieftainship in Canada. The Siksika Nation noted in a 2021 press release that Old Person had been inducted into the chieftainship "several decades ago" for "his work and dedication towards the indigenous people of North America."

Old Person’s advocacy included promoting legislation that included the American Indian Religious Freedom Act of 1978, which protected access to traditional Native sites and religious freedom. He was president of the National Congress of American Indians from 1969 to 1971. The organization formed in 1944 in part to combat the U.S. government's termination and assimilation policies of the time. Among his accomplishments, he served on a committee that founded the nation's first tribally owned bank. He also was a member of a significant number of civic and governmental organizations, including president of the Affiliated Tribes of the Northwest and was named Outstanding Indian of the Year in 1977 by the Chicago Indian Council. Though he was not identified with either US political party, he was asked to speak at the 1988 Republican National Convention. In 1993, Old Person delivered the first-ever State of the Indian Nation address to the Montana Legislature.

In the course of his career, he met every U.S. president from Harry Truman to Barack Obama. He was invited by Queen Elizabeth II to attend the 1978 Commonwealth Games, where he met members of the British royal family and Canadian Prime Minister Pierre Trudeau. He also traveled to Tehran in 1971 as part of a celebration of the 2,500th anniversary of the Persian Empire. There, he inadvertently broke a 1,000-year tradition that the Shah of Iran was never to stand at the request of someone else when Old Person gave a speech and asked Shah Mohammad Reza Pahlavi to join him.

Though he never attended college, Old Person promoted higher education and, in 1991, the University of Montana endowed a scholarship in his name for Blackfeet students. He was awarded an honorary doctorate in 1994 from the University of Montana in Humane Letters. In 1998, he was awarded the Jeannette Rankin Civil Liberties Award by the American Civil Liberties Union of Montana. In 1999, he was the first person awarded the University of Lethbridge's Christine Miller Memorial Award for Excellence in Native American Studies. In 2007, he was inducted into the Montana Indian Hall of Fame.

In retirement, Old Person began an Archives Project to preserve Blackfeet Tribal Governmental documents. He also worked to preserve Blackfeet History and Culture to teach young members about their ancestors through his leadership of the Charging Home Society for Pikuni Education and Cultural Preservation Program. Recognizing the importance of the knowledge he had absorbed over his lifetime, he made a point to record as many songs and stories as he could for future generations.

Old Person worked to preserve the culture and language of the Blackfeet nation. He personally could remember many traditional stories and songs that had otherwise been forgotten. John Murray, the Blackfeet Tribal Historic Preservation Officer, explained, "Earl stayed close to it and he's been an advocate for promoting the language and was able to retain them songs. So when the culture started coming back, they would go to him ... he was a repository for that type of music."

== Death and legacy ==
Old Person died in Browning on October 13, 2021. He was 92 years old and the cause of death was cancer. Following a four-hour funeral, he was buried in his family plot at Grease Wood. Just as the White Calf family made the decision to pass the title of chief on to Earl Old Person, but only after several years had passed, in turn the Old Person family will decide if, when, and who might be appointed as the next chief. Until that decision is made, the Blackfeet Nation will not have a chief.

US Senator Jon Tester stated, "Chief Old Person was a fierce advocate for the Blackfeet Nation and all of Indian Country for his entire life, and the world is a better place because he was in it." The Governor of Montana ordered flags in the state to be flown at half staff in Old Person's honor. At the University of Montana's fall 2021 commencement ceremony, a moment of silence was held for Old Person, and the Rawhide Orchestra played a warrior society song to honor him.

A $300,000 endowment established in November 2021 to support the annual Kyiyo Pow Wow at the University of Montana is named after Old Person, as is a scholarship at Blackfeet Community College.
