= Big Sky Colony, Montana =

- Census-designated place
- Location within Montana Location within the United States
- Coordinates: 48°50′21″N 112°46′06″W
- Country: United States
- State: Montana
- County: Glacier

Area
  - Total: 0.24 sq mi (0.63 km^{2})
  - Land: 0.24 sq mi (0.63 km^{2})
  - Water: 0 sq mi (0.00 km^{2})
- Elevation: 4,200 ft (1,300 m)

Population (2020)
  - Total: 0
  - Density: 0/sq mi (0/km^{2})
- Time zone: UTC-7 (Mountain (MST))
  - Summer (DST): UTC-6 (MDT)
- ZIP Code: 59427 (Cut Bank)
- Area code: 406
- FIPS code: 30-06410
- GNIS feature ID: 2806619

Big Sky Colony is a Hutterite community and census-designated place (CDP) in Glacier County, Montana, United States. It is in the northeastern part of the county, within the Blackfeet Indian Reservation, 36 miles (58 km) by road northwest of Cut Bank and 32 miles (51 km) northeast of Browning.

As of the 2020 census, Big Sky Colony had a population of 0.

Big Sky Colony was first listed as a CDP prior to the 2020 census.

== Demographics ==
Historical population
Census	Pop.	Note	%±
2020	0		—
U.S. Decennial Census

== Education ==
The area school district is Browning Public Schools, with its components being Browning Elementary School District and Browning High School District.
