= Horizon Colony, Montana =

- Census-designated place
- Location within Montana Location within the United States
- Coordinates: 48°43′00″N 112°13′40″W
- Country: United States
- State: Montana
- County: Glacier

Area
  - Total: 0.37 sq mi (0.97 km^{2})
  - Land: 0.37 sq mi (0.97 km^{2})
  - Water: 0 sq mi (0.00 km^{2})
- Elevation: 3,990 ft (1,220 m)

Population (2020)
  - Total: 13
  - Density: 34.6/sq mi (13.37/km^{2})
- Time zone: UTC-7 (Mountain (MST))
  - Summer (DST): UTC-6 (MDT)
- ZIP Code: 59427 (Cut Bank)
- Area code: 406
- FIPS code: 30-37710
- GNIS feature ID: 2806625

Horizon Colony is a Hutterite community and census-designated place (CDP) in Glacier County, Montana, United States. It is on the eastern side of the county, 11 miles (18 km) northeast of Cut Bank and 30 miles (48 km) northwest of Shelby. As of the 2020 census, Horizon Colony had a population of 13.

Horizon Colony was first listed as a CDP prior to the 2020 census.

== Demographics ==
Historical population
Census	Pop.	Note	%±
2020	13		—
U.S. Decennial Census

== Education ==
The area school district is Cut Bank Public Schools, with its components being Cut Bank Elementary School District and Cut Bank High School District.
