= South Browning, Montana =

- Census-designated place
- Location of South Browning, Montana
- Coordinates: 48°32′58″N 113°00′32″W
- Country: United States
- State: Montana
- County: Glacier

Area
  - Total: 2.37 sq mi (6.13 km^{2})
  - Land: 2.34 sq mi (6.06 km^{2})
  - Water: 0.027 sq mi (0.07 km^{2})
- Elevation: 4,390 ft (1,340 m)

Population (2020)
  - Total: 1,970
  - Density: 840/sq mi (325/km^{2})
- Time zone: UTC-7 (Mountain (MST))
  - Summer (DST): UTC-6 (MDT)
- Area code: 406
- FIPS code: 30-69680
- GNIS feature ID: 2408761

South Browning is a census-designated place (CDP) in Glacier County, Montana, United States. As of the 2020 census, South Browning had a population of 1,970. South Browning is a rural village on the Blackfeet Indian Reservation. It is bordered to the north by the town of Browning.

== Geography ==
According to the United States Census Bureau, the CDP has a total area of 2.37 square miles (6.14 km^{2}), of which 2.31 square miles (5.99 km^{2}) is land and 0.06 square miles (0.15 km^{2}), or 2.48%, is water.

== Demographics ==
Historical population
Census	Pop.	Note	%±
2020	1,970		—
U.S. Decennial Census

=== 2020 census ===
As of the 2020 census, South Browning had a population of 1,970. The median age was 26.0 years. 40.1% of residents were under the age of 18 and 6.5% of residents were 65 years of age or older. For every 100 females there were 92.0 males, and for every 100 females age 18 and over there were 80.9 males age 18 and over.

0.0% of residents lived in urban areas, while 100.0% lived in rural areas.

There were 573 households in South Browning, of which 57.8% had children under the age of 18 living in them. Of all households, 30.2% were married-couple households, 18.0% were households with a male householder and no spouse or partner present, and 43.3% were households with a female householder and no spouse or partner present. About 19.6% of all households were made up of individuals and 7.2% had someone living alone who was 65 years of age or older.

There were 609 housing units, of which 5.9% were vacant. The homeowner vacancy rate was 2.8% and the rental vacancy rate was 0.5%.

Racial composition as of the 2020 census
Race	Number	Percent
White	33	1.7%
Black or African American	1	0.1%
American Indian and Alaska Native	1,880	95.4%
Asian	2	0.1%
Native Hawaiian and Other Pacific Islander	0	0.0%
Some other race	2	0.1%
Two or more races	52	2.6%
Hispanic or Latino (of any race)	47	2.4%

=== 2000 census ===
As of the 2000 census, there were 1,677 people, 475 households, and 391 families residing in the CDP. The population density was 719.4 inhabitants per square mile (277.8/km^{2}). There were 526 housing units at an average density of 225.6 per square mile (87.1/km^{2}). The racial makeup of the CDP was 2.44% White, 0.12% African American, 94.39% Native American, 0.54% from other races, and 2.50% from two or more races. Hispanic or Latino of any race were 2.15% of the population.

There were 475 households, out of which 53.3% had children under the age of 18 living with them, 42.5% were married couples living together, 32.0% had a female householder with no husband present, and 17.5% were non-families. 15.2% of all households were made up of individuals, and 2.9% had someone living alone who was 65 years of age or older. The average household size was 3.52 and the average family size was 3.90.

In the CDP, the population was spread out, with 43.2% under the age of 18, 10.3% from 18 to 24, 27.9% from 25 to 44, 14.6% from 45 to 64, and 4.0% who were 65 years of age or older. The median age was 22 years. For every 100 females, there were 93.2 males. For every 100 females age 18 and over, there were 79.8 males.

The median income for a household in the CDP was $12,130, and the median income for a family was $16,167. Males had a median income of $20,278 versus $18,068 for females. The per capita income for the CDP was $5,666. About 51.3% of families and 49.2% of the population were below the poverty line, including 52.8% of those under age 18 and 43.4% of those age 65 or older.

== Education ==
The area school district is Browning Public Schools, with its components being Browning Elementary School District and Browning High School District.
