= Glacier Colony, Montana =

- Census-designated place
- Location within Montana Location within the United States
- Coordinates: 48°49′43″N 112°12′54″W
- Country: United States
- State: Montana
- County: Glacier

Area
  - Total: 0.47 sq mi (1.23 km^{2})
  - Land: 0.47 sq mi (1.23 km^{2})
  - Water: 0 sq mi (0.00 km^{2})
- Elevation: 4,068 ft (1,240 m)

Population (2020)
  - Total: 102
  - Density: 214.9/sq mi (82.98/km^{2})
- Time zone: UTC-7 (Mountain (MST))
  - Summer (DST): UTC-6 (MDT)
- ZIP Code: 59427 (Cut Bank)
- Area code: 406
- FIPS code: 30-30925
- GNIS feature ID: 2806621

Glacier Colony is a Hutterite community and census-designated place (CDP) in Glacier County, Montana, United States. It is in the northeastern part of the county, 18 miles (29 km) by road north-northeast of Cut Bank and 21 miles (34 km) west-southwest of Sunburst.

As of the 2020 census, Glacier Colony had a population of 102.

Glacier Colony was first listed as a CDP prior to the 2020 census.

== Demographics ==
Historical population
Census	Pop.	Note	%±
2020	102		—
U.S. Decennial Census

== Education ==
The area school district is Cut Bank Public Schools, with its components being Cut Bank Elementary School District and Cut Bank High School District.
