= Hidden Lake Colony, Montana =

- Census-designated place
- Location within Montana Location within the United States
- Coordinates: 48°35′55″N 112°36′11″W
- Country: United States
- State: Montana
- County: Glacier

Area
  - Total: 0.23 sq mi (0.59 km^{2})
  - Land: 0.23 sq mi (0.59 km^{2})
  - Water: 0 sq mi (0.00 km^{2})
- Elevation: 4,078 ft (1,243 m)

Population (2020)
  - Total: 99
  - Density: 436.2/sq mi (168.41/km^{2})
- Time zone: UTC-7 (Mountain (MST))
  - Summer (DST): UTC-6 (MDT)
- ZIP Code: 59417 (Browning)
- Area code: 406
- FIPS code: 30-36055
- GNIS feature ID: 2806623

Hidden Lake Colony is a Hutterite community and census-designated place (CDP) in Glacier County, Montana, United States. It is in the eastern part of the county, 2.5 miles (4.0 km) south of U.S. Route 2, 15 miles (24 km) west-southwest of Cut Bank, and 25 miles (40 km) east-northeast of Browning.

Hidden Lake Colony was first listed as a CDP prior to the 2020 census. As of the 2020 census, Hidden Lake Colony had a population of 99.

== Demographics ==
Historical population
Census	Pop.	Note	%±
2020	99		—
U.S. Decennial Census
