= North Browning, Montana =

- Census-designated place
- Location of North Browning, Montana
- Coordinates: 48°34′14″N 113°01′36″W
- Country: United States
- State: Montana
- County: Glacier

Area
  - Total: 2.90 sq mi (7.51 km^{2})
  - Land: 2.89 sq mi (7.49 km^{2})
  - Water: 0.0077 sq mi (0.02 km^{2})
- Elevation: 4,426 ft (1,349 m)

Population (2020)
  - Total: 2,653
  - Density: 917.7/sq mi (354.32/km^{2})
- Time zone: UTC-7 (Mountain (MST))
  - Summer (DST): UTC-6 (MDT)
- Area code: 406
- FIPS code: 30-54510
- GNIS feature ID: 2408935

North Browning is a census-designated place (CDP) in Glacier County, Montana, United States. As of the 2020 census, North Browning had a population of 2,653.

== Geography ==
North Browning is bordered to the south by the town of Browning and is within the bounds of the Blackfeet Indian Reservation.

According to the United States Census Bureau, the CDP has a total area of 3.8 square miles (9.9 km^{2}), of which 0.01 square miles (0.02 km^{2}), or 0.23%, is water.

== Demographics ==
Historical population
Census	Pop.	Note	%±
2020	2,653		—
U.S. Decennial Census

=== 2020 census ===
As of the 2020 census, North Browning had a population of 2,653. The median age was 29.8 years. 34.5% of residents were under the age of 18 and 10.2% of residents were 65 years of age or older. For every 100 females there were 91.0 males, and for every 100 females age 18 and over there were 85.7 males age 18 and over.

0.0% of residents lived in urban areas, while 100.0% lived in rural areas.

There were 771 households in North Browning, of which 52.3% had children under the age of 18 living in them. Of all households, 33.1% were married-couple households, 19.1% were households with a male householder and no spouse or partner present, and 38.7% were households with a female householder and no spouse or partner present. About 18.2% of all households were made up of individuals and 6.2% had someone living alone who was 65 years of age or older.

There were 811 housing units, of which 4.9% were vacant. The homeowner vacancy rate was 0.0% and the rental vacancy rate was 1.8%.

Racial composition as of the 2020 census
Race	Number	Percent
White	49	1.8%
Black or African American	0	0.0%
American Indian and Alaska Native	2,531	95.4%
Asian	1	0.0%
Native Hawaiian and Other Pacific Islander	0	0.0%
Some other race	4	0.2%
Two or more races	68	2.6%
Hispanic or Latino (of any race)	62	2.3%

=== 2000 census ===
As of the 2000 census, there were 2,200 people, 600 households, and 495 families residing in the CDP. The population density was 744.8 inhabitants per square mile (287.6/km^{2}). There were 645 housing units at an average density of 218.4 per square mile (84.3/km^{2}). The racial makeup of the CDP was 4.64% White, 0.05% African American, 93.73% Native American, 0.05% Asian, 0.14% Pacific Islander, and 1.41% from two or more races. Hispanic or Latino of any race were 1.23% of the population.

There were 600 households, out of which 53.3% had children under the age of 18 living with them, 46.3% were married couples living together, 29.5% had a female householder with no husband present, and 17.5% were non-families. 16.2% of all households were made up of individuals, and 3.0% had someone living alone who was 65 years of age or older. The average household size was 3.53 and the average family size was 3.98.

In the CDP, the population was spread out, with 38.7% under the age of 18, 11.2% from 18 to 24, 29.4% from 25 to 44, 16.4% from 45 to 64, and 4.3% who were 65 years of age or older. The median age was 25 years. For every 100 females, there were 99.6 males. For every 100 females age 18 and over, there were 95.4 males.

The median income for a household in the CDP was $24,399, and the median income for a family was $26,071. Males had a median income of $21,094 versus $25,644 for females. The per capita income for the CDP was $8,572. About 27.6% of families and 35.7% of the population were below the poverty line, including 41.4% of those under age 18 and 41.8% of those age 65 or over.

== Education ==
The area school district is Browning Public Schools, with its components being Browning Elementary School District and Browning High School District.
