= Chief Mountain =

Mountain in Montana, United States

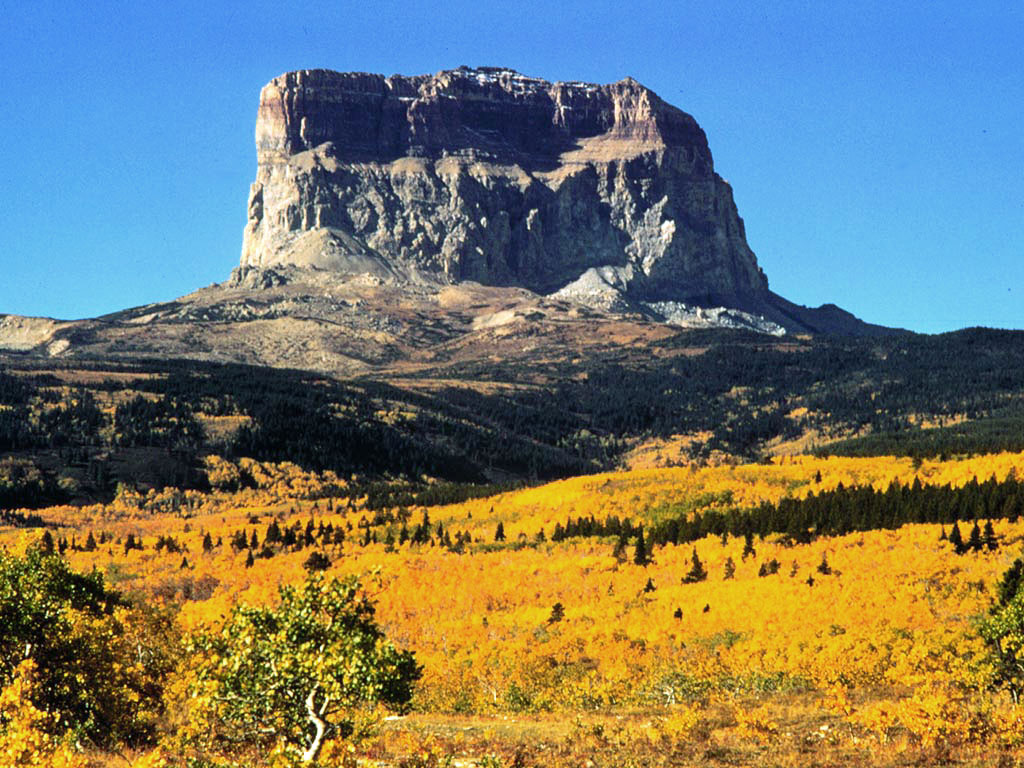

Highest point
- Elevation: 9,085 ft (2,769 m) NAVD 88
- Prominence: 1,840 ft (560 m)
- Coordinates: 48°55′58″N 113°36′35″W

Geography
- Location within Montana Location within the United States
- Location: Glacier County, Montana, U.S.
- Parent range: Lewis Range
- Topo map(s): USGS Chief Mountain, MT

Climbing
- First ascent: 1892 by Stimson, et al.
- Easiest route: Scramble

Chief Mountain (9,085 feet or 2,769 metres) is located in the U.S. state of Montana on the eastern border of Glacier National Park and the Blackfeet Indian Reservation. The mountain is one of the most prominent peaks and rock formations along the Rocky Mountain Front, a 200-mile-long (320 km) overthrust fault, known as the Lewis Overthrust, which extends from central Montana into southern Alberta, Canada.

== Geology ==
Chief Mountain is an example of a klippe. It consists of a Precambrian block which rests directly above much younger Cretaceous gray shales. The 1450-1400 million year old Precambrian rocks are 1300-1400 million years older than the Cretaceous rocks at the base of the mountain.

Having an older layer of rock juxtaposed atop younger basement rocks is found on occasion in thrust faults and is commonplace along the Lewis Overthrust which extends from central Montana to far southern Alberta. The surrounding portion of the thrust sheet has been removed by erosion leaving behind this and a few other isolated blocks of Proterozoic rock.

== History and significance ==
Chief Mountain has been a sacred mountain to the tribes of Native Americans in the United States and First Nations in Canada for hundreds of years. The Blackfoot name for the mountain is Nínaiistáko. The peak is easily seen from Montana and Alberta due to the rapid 5,000-foot (1,500 m) altitude gain over the Great Plains which are immediately east of the mountain.

The mountain was seen by white explorers in the late 18th century and was known as "Kings Peak" on maps produced in the United Kingdom in 1795. In the early 1900s as white settlers came to the area, they observed native burial sites scattered along the base of the mountain. The name was changed in the late 19th century in reflection of Blackfeet naming of the mountain which was "Great Chief". When Glacier National Park was created in 1910, the summit and most prominent eastern slopes of the mountain were located within the park, leaving only the lower slopes within Blackfeet Indian Reservation.

Natives from all over North America travel to the base of the mountain for sweet grass ceremonies, placing of prayer flags and other religious rites. Elders from Southern Alberta's Siksika Band (where the Great Chief Crowfoot hailed from) and other First Nation groups have an oral tradition that near the end of days, a Great White God would appear from the top of Chief Mountain and upon his departure, the mountain would crumble and be destroyed.

== Climbing ==
The eastern face of the mountain rises over 1,500 ft (460 m) vertically and the easiest route on this section is rated class 4 by mountaineers. The rock is also primarily sedimentary and provides poor anchor points, which in turn is a contributing factor to the difficulty rating. Henry Stimson and two other explorers, including a Blackfeet Indian, climbed the difficult eastern face on September 8, 1892, and this is the first known ascent of the peak by white explorers. Upon the summit, Stimson's party observed ceremonial remains including bison skulls that had been left behind by Native Americans. The eastern face of the peak was not successfully climbed again until 1951. Though the summit can be gained by approaching from the west, the easiest access is from the east, and the Blackfeet tribe may issue access permits to cross reservation lands. This entire area is sacred to the Blackfeet Native Americans. National Park Service visitor centers at St. Mary, Montana, and at Many Glacier have additional information available.

== See also ==
- Rocky Mountains
- Ninaki Mountain
- Mountains and mountain ranges of Glacier National Park (U.S.)
