= Santa Rita, Montana =

- Census-designated place
- Location within Montana Location within the United States
- Coordinates: 48°41′54″N 112°19′08″W
- Country: United States
- State: Montana
- County: Glacier

Area
  - Total: 3.46 sq mi (8.97 km^{2})
  - Land: 3.46 sq mi (8.97 km^{2})
  - Water: 0 sq mi (0.00 km^{2})
- Elevation: 3,799 ft (1,158 m)

Population (2020)
  - Total: 107
  - Density: 30.9/sq mi (11.93/km^{2})
- Time zone: UTC-7 (Mountain (MST))
  - Summer (DST): UTC-6 (MDT)
- Area code: 406
- FIPS code: 30-66250
- GNIS feature ID: 2583843

Santa Rita is a census-designated place (CDP) in Glacier County, Montana, United States. The population was 107 at the 2020 census. It is located along Montana Secondary Highway 213, 5 miles north of Cut Bank.

== Geography ==
=== Climate ===
According to the Köppen Climate Classification system, Santa Rita has a semi-arid climate, abbreviated "BSk" on climate maps.

== Demographics ==
Historical population
Census	Pop.	Note	%±
2020	107		—
U.S. Decennial Census

== Education ==
The area school district is Cut Bank Public Schools, with its components being Cut Bank Elementary School District and Cut Bank High School District.
