= Disappearance of Ashley Loring Heavyrunner =

Unsolved 2017 disappearance of 20 year-old Blackfoot woman from Montana

Coordinates: 48.686833°N 113.363472°W

Ashley Loring Heavyrunner
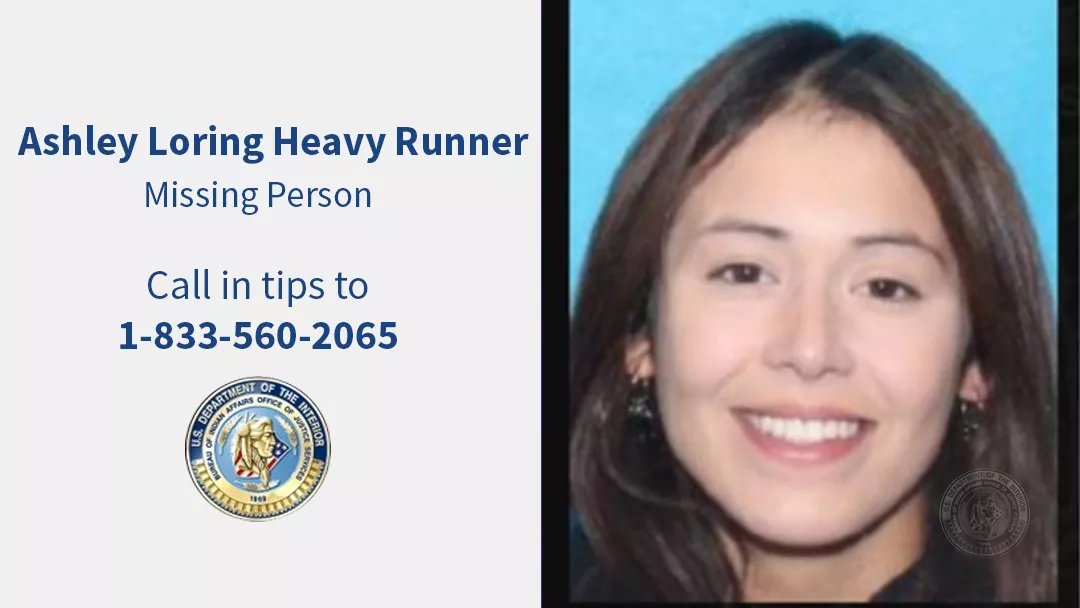
- Born: Ashley Mariah Loring Heavyrunner; November 23, 1996; Browning, Blackfeet Indian Reservation, Montana, U.S.
- Disappeared: June 13, 2017 (aged 20) near Divide Mountain, Montana
- Status: Missing for 9 years, 4 months and 27 days
- Education: Blackfeet Community College
- Height: 5 ft 2 in (1.57 m)

Ashley Loring Heavyrunner (born November 23, 1996; also known as Ashley Loring Heavy Runner) is a Blackfoot woman who went missing on the week of June 13, 2017, near Babb, Montana, U.S.. The circumstances of Heavyrunner's disappearance, and the resulting investigations by several government agencies, became significant to the Missing and Murdered Indigenous Women movement.

== Background ==
Heavyrunner was born on November 23, 1996 in Browning, Montana, on the Blackfeet Reservation. She is an enrolled member of the Blackfeet Nation. Heavyrunner is a descendant of Chief Heavy Runner, leader of a Piegan Blackfeet band, who was killed during the Marias Massacre.

She and her sister were in foster care for several months before being legally adopted by her grandmother, along with her older brother and younger sister. They lived on her grandfather's ranch near Heart Butte, on the Rocky Mountain Front, where she learned to ride horses. Heavyrunner reconnected with her mother later in life after her mother's struggles with depression and addiction. (Note: Heavyrunner's mother and grandmother share the same name (Loxie Loring).) A godmother and a star athlete, Heavyrunner played volleyball and pursued cross-country running in high school, which she graduated from in 2015. Heavyrunner was frequently described by her friends and family as smart, "feisty" and as someone who was always interested in helping others. A few months before her disappearance, Heavyrunner expressed interest in raising awareness about Missing and Murdered Indigenous Women to her sister and to her professor at Blackfeet Community College.

Heavyrunner was reportedly exploring a career in forestry, and was excelling at Blackfeet Community College, where she was studying environmental science. According Heavyrunner's sister, Heavyrunner was waiting for her sister to return from overseas, as Heavyrunner was planning on moving into her sister's apartment in Missoula in 2017 after being accepted into the University of Montana. This was conceived as a fresh start off the reservation, after Heavyrunner's sister learnt of Heavyrunner's recent drug use. According to her sister, Heavyrunner was also pregnant at the time when she went missing. However, she believes that the unnamed father (a family friend) was not involved in her eventual disappearance.

== Disappearance ==
=== Last contact ===
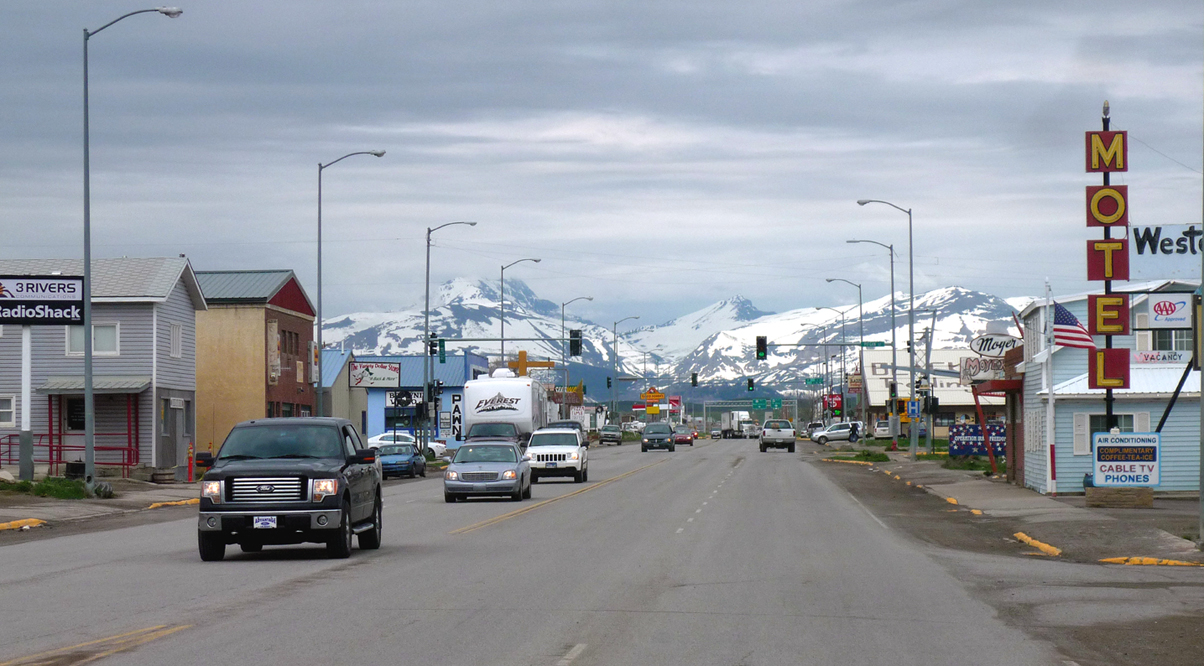
Heavyrunner was last publicly seen in Browning, Montana.

According to multiple friends and a video published online, Heavyrunner was last seen at a house party in Browning on June 5, having taken a ride from her family's ranch. On June 6, Heavyrunner sent a message to her sister asking for money, but as she was overseas she couldn't help. Heavyrunner's last messages were via Facebook on June 7, requesting a ride home. However once implored, Heavyrunner went silent. Heavyrunner's sister called Heavyrunner on June 8 once she returned to Browning from overseas, but was unable to contact her, with mutual friends stating that Heavyrunner was with a family friend and could have lost her phone (which had happened before). After June 6, Heavyrunner had apparently been in contact online with various friends (some of whom she hadn't been in contact for years), but not with her extended family; Heavyrunner's sister believes someone else was accessing her phone, due to the vocabulary and spelling used.

=== Mixed narratives ===
In the months leading up to her disappearance, Heavyrunner had been struggling with the death of her grandfather and a serious breakup. She began self-isolating, skipping classes at Blackfeet Community College, drinking more, and became involved with an older circle of friends (some of whom were rumored to use and sell methamphetamines). Heavyrunner also began experimenting with methamphetamines, with her sister describing her drug use as "a very short, strong phase of her life". The party on June 5 was said to have occurred in a known 'party house' (subject to many investigations) where drugs were used, according to a Blackfeet Law Enforcement Services (BLES) officer speaking with The Guardian in 2019.

One of these new friends was Sam MacDonald; after the June 5 party both MacDonald and Heavyrunner reportedly went to McDonald's cabin for an extended period of time. On June 11, McDonald told her that she needed to return home. As they were driving to Browning, Heavyrunner asked McDonald to pull over so that Valenzuela (the husband of Heavyrunner's cousin) could pick her up, along with directions to a local cabin. McDonald stated that he fell asleep as he'd been up "for days", and upon finding Heavyrunner missing, assumed that Valenzuela had picked her up. In her testimony to the U.S Senate in 2018, Heavyrunner's sister stated that Heavyrunner went missing on June 12, with the FBI officially recording the week of June 13 as the date of disappearance.

When their father went to hospital with a liver condition on June 14, Heavyrunner was once again uncontactable, which was especially unusual as the family was close. Once their family friend confirmed Heavyrunner was not with them (and therefore had not been seen in two weeks), Heavyrunner's family filed a missing persons report and reached out to the wider community about Heavyrunner's disappearance. Heavyrunner's sister claims that upon further questioning, some friends became "defensive", claiming Heavyrunner had been "hurt" and that "someone had taken her to the mountains". Amongst others, Heavyrunner's sister suspected a relative may have been involved in Heavyrunner's disappearance, and that people who knew about Heavyrunner's fate were still present in the community but weren't communicating with authorities. According to a BLES officer, over a century of injustices against the Blackfoot people by the United States created a culture of distrust against law enforcement. The group of older drug-using friends Heavyrunner participated in similarly operates a cone of silence about Heavyrunner's fate.

==== Persons of interest ====
===== Sam McDonald =====
McDonald "partied" with Heavyrunner at his remote lakeside cabin for six days, and was the last person on record to have seen Heavyrunner on the morning of June 11. Heavyrunner's sweater and boots were also recovered near his property. A user of methamphetamines at the time, police questioned McDonald several times, with McDonald stating he had been "framed". McDonald further claims that law enforcement broke the lock on his door and searched his house six times. Heavyrunner's sister spoke with McDonald in the summer of 2019, however McDonald repeatedly passed culpability to Running Crane & Valenzuela, and visa versa.

===== Running Crane & Valenzuela =====
In the three weeks leading up to her disappearance, Heavyrunner was "romantically involved" with Paul "V-Dog" Valenzuela, the husband of her cousin (Tashina "Tee" Running Crane). Valenzuela filed for divorce around a month after Heavyrunner went missing disappeared, although Running Crane and Heavyrunner's family stated that they were unaware of the relationship until after Heavyrunner's disappearance. Valenzuela is a convicted felon known for repeatedly committing violent crimes in the Seattle area and the Blackfeet Reservation, and is believed to be involved in trafficking methamphetamines into the reservation.

Running Crane told police that she and Valenzuela were in Seattle, Washington at the time of Heavyrunner's disappearance, with Washington state court records showing Valenzuela was present in the Seattle area in early June (after being convicted of an illegal firearms charge). However, Valenzuela also told the Washington State Department of Corrections on June 9 that he'd be returning to the Blackfeet Reservation to collect his belongings, with Valenzuela possibly returning solo to the reservation on June 11. On June 26, Heavyrunner's sister contacted both Running Crane and Valenzuela. Running Crane told Heavyrunner's sister that Valenzuela picked Heavyrunner up and took her to another town, claiming "Paul has her". However, when Valenzuela was questioned by Heavyrunner's sister, he "freaked out" and accused Running Crane of lying. Later via text, he denied picking up Heavyrunner, and stated "Tashina is giving you false info. Ask her she prolly knows more than she's saying." Valenzuela had told Washington law enforcement he'd return on the first week of July. However, he subsequently began evading authorities, only to return for a sentencing hearing in September 2017.

In September 2017, Running Crane posted a 14 minute video on YouTube claiming Valenzuela was framing her for Heavyrunner's disappearance, stating "...he has Ashley. Everyone in this town knows it." However this was soon removed from the internet. Later in 2017, Running Crane met with ABC Nightline, where she spoke of her reconciliation with Valenzuela and her acceptance of his denials of responsibility. Incarcerated at the time, Valenzuela attempted to call Running Crane during her interview. However, once asked about Heavyrunner's case, he quickly ended the call.

In the same interview, Running Crane claimed she had also been searching for Heavyrunner (which the family disputed), and denied that she caught Heavyrunner with Valenzuela. After being asked about Valenzuela's text messages with Heavyrunner's sister, she abruptly ended the interview. Valenzuela later contacted ABC Nightline; in exchange for a prison transfer, he offered to reveal who was responsible for Heavyrunner's fate, stating "I'll even bring you where the people who did all this to Ashley. Trust me I am the only one who can." As the transfer was not executed, Valenzuela refused to be interviewed. Running Crane reportedly moved out of the reservation in response to allegations that she was involved in Heavyrunner's disappearance.

=== Possible post-disappearance sightings ===
Weeks after Heavyrunner's went missing, local reporter Rachel CrowSpreadingWings reportedly saw Heavyrunner as she pulled over to pick berries. A young woman who appeared to be Heavyrunner approached, and responded that her name was "Ashley" when questioned. A man stood intimidatingly on the road; CrowSpreadingWings believed the woman was afraid of him, and noted both looked "disheveled". CrowSpreadingWings reported the incident to the police, but was not followed up with. When she later approached the FBI, she was told there was no record of her tip. Several other sightings have been reported, but by 2025 Heavyrunner's sister believed that Heavyrunner was deceased by the time she returned from overseas on the June 8, 2017.

== Response ==
=== Initial investigation ===
Two weeks after Heavyrunner's disappearance, in late June, Heavyrunner's family filed a missing person's report with Blackfeet Law Enforcement Services (BLES) and the Bureau of Indian Affairs (BIA). Heavyrunner's family allege that police appeared dismissive about Heavyrunner's disappearance and suggested she didn't want to be found (citing her association with a party crowd and her age of majority), despite protests from her family and friends.

Heavyrunner's family were subject to myriad of conflicting tips about Heavyrunner's fate, which ended up containing little substance. On June 25, Heavyrunner's family received an important lead. A young woman had been seen running from a male in a vehicle on U.S. Highway 89 (near Divide Mountain) on the night Heavyrunner disappeared. Subsequently, Heavyrunner's family BIA and the BLES conducted a three-day search. On June 28, a "tattered" grey sweater and a pair of red-stained boots were recovered near Babb, on the northernwestern edge of the reservation, in an area Heavyrunner's sister described as "desolate" near Heavyrunner's last potential sighting. The sweater, with gray stripes and a "heart on the back", was recovered from a garbage dump. The family was certain these items were Heavyrunner's, as they were Heavyrunner's size, and an eyewitness (along with a local waitress) affirmed the sweater was the same she was wearing on June 5, only now covered in "red spots" and holes.

The BIA started seriously investigating two months after Heavyrunner went missing. However, when approached, the BIA reportedly stated "Ashley is of age and she could leave when she wanted to". While the evidence was transferred from the BLES to the BIA, the BIA agent attached to the case claimed repeatedly that the items were sent to a crime lab. However, eight months later the BIA agent then stated that the evidence couldn't be transferred due to "testing reasons". By December 2018, the evidence was still held by the BIA. While the FBI eventually recovered the items when they joined the investigation, no results from forensic testing have ever been released publicly, with the BIA stating in 2021 that "the FBI Crime lab did confirm they received evidence and conducted an analysis of it, but because the case is active, we are unable to provide any additional information."

=== Further mismanagement ===
==== Police inaction ====
The Heavyrunner family alleges that local police were not responsive and did not initiate further searches for Heavyrunner after the summer of 2017. The BLES claimed they performed an additional search in the same location as the evidence was collected on July 28, 2017. However, by December 2018 a BLES officer working on the case could not recall a search, and the family did not observe neither the BLES or BIA in further searches. Additionally, the family learnt that lead BLES officer investigating the case was romantically involved with a prime suspect and leaking information to them. Furthermore, the BLES redirected the family to a BIA agent, as they were no longer taking any tips on the case. A BLES officer speaking to The Guardian in 2019 spoke of chasing multiple leads, to no avail.

In November 2017, the Blackfeet Tribal Business Council told ABC News that local police were severely understaffed, with less than 20 police officers across the 1.5 million acre reservation, and a call load that resembles Montana's largest cities with a maximum of active five officers at a time. The adjoining Glacier National Park contains another 1 million acres. The BIA stated that they had conducted six searches, 60 interviews and posted a financial reward, and had labelled suspects and people of interest. BLES refused to comment on the case. However, both the Heavyrunner family and US Senator Steve Daines believe that the BIA allegedly did not document or follow up on most leads and information provided, with no response from the BIA agent by December 2018 despite multiple attempts at contact by the family. Frustrated by police inaction and a period of limited contact after the initial search, Heavyrunner's sister quit her job in Missoula and moved back to the reservation, organizing over 100 searches with volunteers & became a prominent investigator in the disappearance of her sister, including at least one door-knocking campaign in Babb. Heavyrunner's sister has also stated that she has received death threats for her investigations.

==== Valenzuela's trailer ====
In June 2018, Heavyrunner's family received permission to search Valenzuela and Running Crane's trailer (which Heavyrunner had reportedly visited) which had already been examined by investigators. After the discovery of a "maroon stain beneath the shag carpet", evidence was submitted for testing but no results were released.

=== FBI involvement and subsequent investigation ===
The FBI began offering assistance to the investigation in November 2017, reportedly due to the length of time Heavyrunner had been missing. In March 2018, the FBI announced that the BIA had requested the FBI to take over, with the BIA stating "Due to leads coming in off the reservation the FBI took the lead of the investigation so they can follow up on those leads outside of Indian Country." The family noted relief that the FBI was involved, however Heavyrunner's sister noted that the BIA had investigated the case off-reservation already, and had already received leads Heavyrunner could be in Washington or New Mexico. Adjusted from between June 5 and 8, the FBI ultimately listed the official disappearance date for Heavyrunner as the week of June 13, 2017.

In February 2019, the FBI Laboratory in Quantico declared that human remains discovered on the Blackfeet Reservation in 2018 were not Heavyrunner. In October 2019, Heavyrunner's family questioned to ABC Nightline why the FBI office investigating Heavyrunner's case (Salt Lake City) took months begin investigating Heavyrunner's case but only weeks to join the search for Mackenzie Lueck, a white University of Utah student, whose body and murderer were found within a month. The BIA and FBI refused to comment on the case.

In 2021, Heavyrunner's family told Dateline NBC that they have not received feedback from police from several lines of gathered evidence. In response, the BIA stated "the BIA, the Office of Justice Services, Missing and Murdered Unit did receive some recent tips related to the case that officers followed up with, but those did not result in any new information." Valenzuela was questioned in 2021, but denied knowledge of Heavyrunner's whereabouts. As of 2026, Heavyrunner is still missing, and the police have not named any suspects or pursued any arrests, despite several reported sightings of Heavyrunner and possible leads across the country. Heavyrunner's family announced in 2025 that they'd commit to one more search before they "leave it in God's hands.

=== Financial reward ===
In 2017, the BIA initially posted a reward of $1,000 for information relating to Heavyrunner's disappearance; by March 2018, this had increased to $10,000, then $15,000 by April 2019, with the Blackfeet Tribal Business Council also contributing.

== Missing and Murdered Indigenous Women movement ==
The disappearance of Heavyrunner is one of the most prominent cases highlighted by the national Missing and Murdered Indigenous Women movement (MMIW), and has been the feature of high-profile media coverage. The lack of jurisdiction of tribal police on criminal matters, the subsequent delayed investigations, the systemic lack of federal funding, police citing age of majority, and a lack of coordination and interest by overlapping federal authorities have been observed in both Heavyrunner's case and wider MMIW cases, which former U.S Senator Heidi Heitkamp noted increases the vulnerability of Indigenous communities to outsider violence due to a lack of deterrence and prosecution.

=== Montana ===
The relatives of Olivia Lone Bear, a Mandan Hidatsa Arikara Nation woman (who also went missing in 2017 but was discovered dead on the Fort Berthold Indian Reservation) have helped with the search for Heavyrunner. Starting in 2018, an annual walk happens every year in Browning, Montana in Heavyrunner's memory (Ashley's Walk), along with other victims associated with MMIW. Heavyrunner's mother also placed purple-colored balloons around Browning in honor of Heavyrunner's favorite color. Montana has the highest rate of MMIW cases in the United States, with over 24 indigenous women going missing in Montana in 2018 alone. Then-Montana congressman Greg Gianforte commented on Heavyrunner's case and the MMIW cause at large to MTN News in 2018. Speaking on Heavyrunner's case in 2019, a BLES officer discussed the systemically high rates of addiction and abuse on the Blackfeet Reservation, and the subsequent vulnerability of intoxicated women at local parties. MMIW cases from Montana have been used to contrast the disproportionately reduced media coverage that missing Indigenous women receive as compared to Gabby Petito and other white women who go missing. A former professor of Heavyrunner's at Blackfeet Community College, Annita Lucchesi, became the founding Director of the Sovereign Bodies Institute, which centralizes data on MMIW cases in the US and Canada. A former high school classmate of Heavyrunner, Haley Omeasoo, founded Ohkomi Forensics in 2023 in part due to Heavyrunner's disappearance. The nonprofit only offers its services to families of missing and murdered Indigenous people.

=== Senate Committee ===
In December 2018, the United States Senate Committee on Indian Affairs met to discuss the nationwide crisis of missing and murdered indigenous women, led by Senator Jon Tester and supported by Senator Steve Daines, both from Montana. On December 12, Heavyrunner's sister testified before the Committee about the systemic mishandling of the investigation. Heavyrunner's sister also asked for an inquiry into law enforcement personnel working on cases involving missing and murdered indigenous women. Days before her sister's testimony, Heavyrunner appeared on the National Missing and Unidentified Persons System publicly for the first time. A day after her testimony, human remains were reportedly discovered on the reservation, although these were later identified as not belonging to Heavyrunner.

From the very beginning, both the Blackfeet Tribal Law Enforcement and the (Bureau of Indian Affairs) have ignored the dire situation that Ashely is in and have allowed the investigation to be handled in a dysfunctional manner. This isn't just a reality for our family but a reality for many murdered and missing indigenous women's families.

The United States Senate Committee on Indian Affairs created legislative proposals with bipartisan support, however by October 2019 the bills had stalled in Congress without BIA or FBI approval. In response, President Donald Trump created the Task Force on Missing and Murdered American Indians and Alaska Natives (Operation Lady Justice) in 2019, which was further bolstered in 2021 by President Joe Biden. Additionally, both Savanna's Act and Not Invisible Act were signed into law by 2020, along with the re-authorization of the Violence Against Women Act in 2022.

=== Similar disappearances ===
Heavyrunner's family and the Blackfeet Tribal Business Council noted with NBC Montana that disappearances, unsolved murders and a lack of investigations have plagued the Blackfeet Reservation for decades, yet the issue is severely underreported. The disappearance of Heavyrunner coincided with coverage of Matthew Grant's disappearance and death in 2016, who was also an indigenous resident of Browning, along with the disappearance of Jermain Charlo from Missoula. The 2021 edition of Ashley's Walk included searches for 26-year-old Leo Wagner and 3-year-old Arden Pepion, who both disappeared on the Blackfeet Reservation in 2021. Heavyrunner is a relative of Gabe Calfbossribs, who disappeared in 2024; Blackfeet Law Enforcement Services denied NBC Montana access to records attached to both cases in 2025.
