= Glendale Colony, Montana =

- Census-designated place
- Location within Montana Location within the United States
- Coordinates: 48°50′36″N 112°32′38″W
- Country: United States
- State: Montana
- County: Glacier

Area
  - Total: 0.37 sq mi (0.97 km^{2})
  - Land: 0.37 sq mi (0.95 km^{2})
  - Water: 0.0077 sq mi (0.02 km^{2})
- Elevation: 4,045 ft (1,233 m)

Population (2020)
  - Total: 97
  - Density: 263.6/sq mi (101.76/km^{2})
- Time zone: UTC-7 (Mountain (MST))
  - Summer (DST): UTC-6 (MDT)
- ZIP Code: 59427 (Cut Bank)
- Area code: 406
- FIPS code: 30-31418
- GNIS feature ID: 2806622

Glendale Colony is a Hutterite community and census-designated place (CDP) in Glacier County, Montana, United States. It is in the northeastern part of the county, within the Blackfeet Indian Reservation, 21 miles (34 km) north-northwest of Cut Bank. As of the 2020 census, Glendale Colony had a population of 97.

Glendale Colony was first listed as a CDP prior to the 2020 census.

== Demographics ==
Historical population
Census	Pop.	Note	%±
2020	97		—
U.S. Decennial Census

== Education ==
The area school district is Browning Public Schools, with its components being Browning Elementary School District and Browning High School District.
