= Seville Colony, Montana =

- Census-designated place
- Location within Montana Location within the United States
- Coordinates: 48°42′21″N 112°35′34″W
- Country: United States
- State: Montana
- County: Glacier

Area
  - Total: 0.37 sq mi (0.97 km^{2})
  - Land: 0.37 sq mi (0.97 km^{2})
  - Water: 0 sq mi (0.00 km^{2})
- Elevation: 3,937 ft (1,200 m)

Population (2020)
  - Total: 0
  - Density: 0/sq mi (0/km^{2})
- Time zone: UTC-7 (Mountain (MST))
  - Summer (DST): UTC-6 (MDT)
- ZIP Code: 59427 (Cut Bank)
- Area code: 406
- FIPS code: 30-67192
- GNIS feature ID: 2806627

Seville Colony (Blackfeet: Tsahkiitoh, "Hill on a prairie") is a Hutterite community and census-designated place (CDP) in Glacier County, Montana, United States. As of the 2020 census, Seville Colony had a population of 0. It is in the eastern part of the county, 17 miles (27 km) by road northwest of Cut Bank and 26 miles (42 km) northeast of Browning.

Seville Colony was first listed as a CDP prior to the 2020 census.

== Demographics ==
Historical population
Census	Pop.	Note	%±
2020	0		—
U.S. Decennial Census

== Education ==
It is in the Mountain View Elementary School District and the Cut Bank High School District.
