= Blackfeet Indian Writing Company =

Pen and pencil manufacturer

The Blackfeet Indian Writing Company (or Blackfeet Writing Instruments) was a pen and pencil manufacturer on the Blackfeet Nation in Browning, Montana founded in 1972. The company grew in 1981 when they bought out Lindy, a ballpoint pen manufacturer, for $700,000 which they profited from expanding their company up $6.2 million. As part of a tribal owned economic initiative, the factory opened in 1972, but closed in the early 2000s. The company was transferred from the tribe to a private employee-owned company in 1992.

The pencils were made out of ceramics that were shown in specialty catalogs in the early 1990s. The Blackfeet Indian writing company is the most popular pencil; however, they were bought out to a private firm in 1992. Sales suffered and went down to 27,000 pencils made.

The company made, among other products, the cedar wood "Blackfeet Indian Pencil" in various hardnesses. The "swagger stick" ballpoint pen was, for a time, an official writing implement of the United States Senate. The company also introduced the 'Earth Pencil', an eraserless pencil produced entirely from natural products, including soy ink for imprinting. The former factory burned down in 2019.

Composer John Luther Adams still uses Blackfeet Indian pencils when writing music. The 42 pencils in their museum are located in Browning, Montana.
