= Ninaki Mountain =

Mountain in Montana, United States

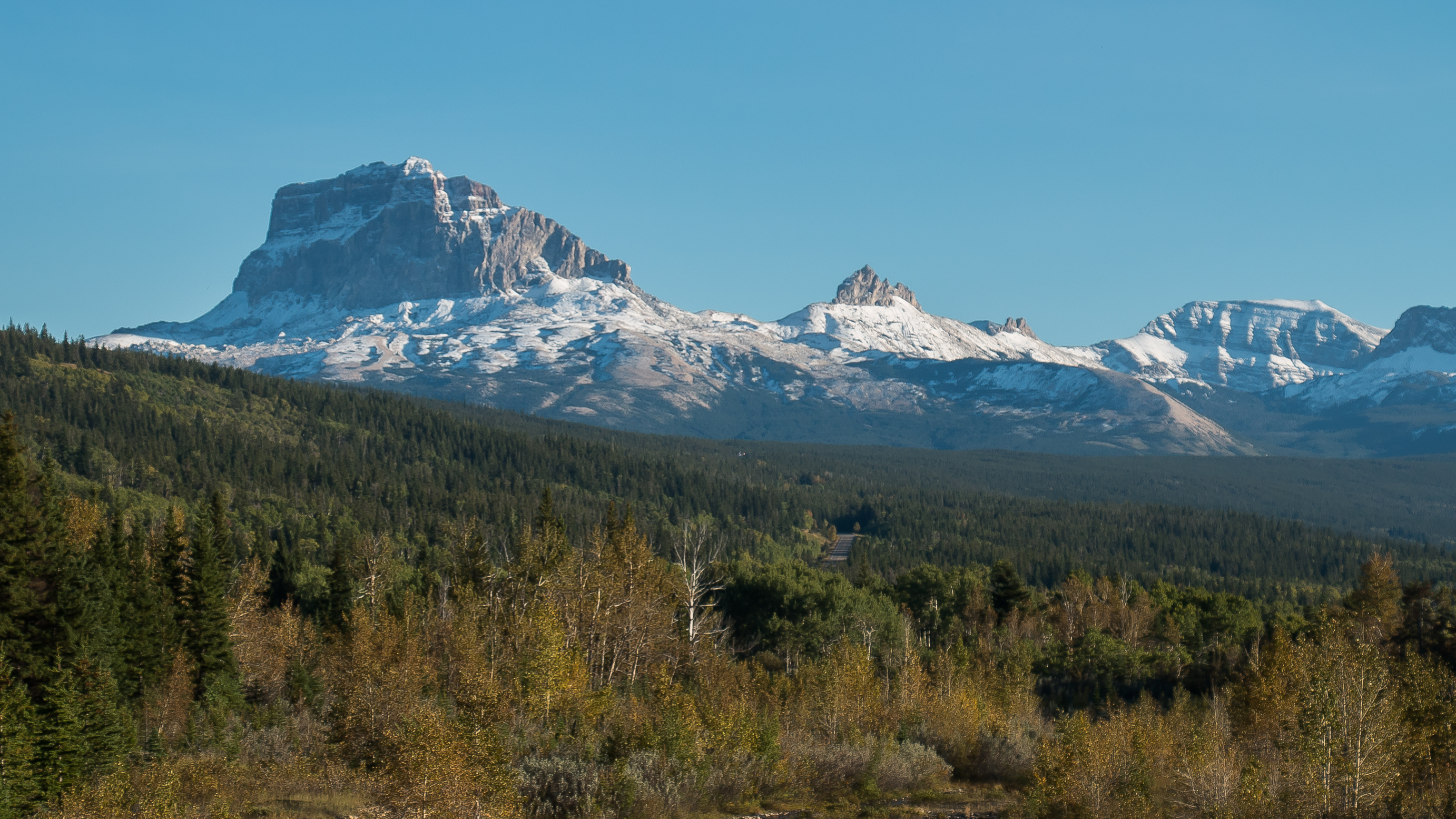
- The Peaks of Chief Mountain and Ninaki Mountain, seen from Belly River, Waterton Lakes National Park

Highest point
- Elevation: 2,525 metres (8,284 ft)
- Coordinates: 48°55′30″N 113°37′29″W

Geography
- Location within Montana
- Location: Montana

Ninaki Mountain is located in Montana, 20 kilometres (12 miles) southwest of Carway, Alberta and 1 kilometre (0.62 miles) southwest of Chief Mountain. It was named in honour of the sacrifice of the wife who threw her baby, then herself off the mountain in reaction to the death of her war-chief husband as a result of a battle which took place between Peigan and Blackfeet warriors.
