= Zenith Colony, Montana =

- Census-designated place
- Location within Montana Location within the United States
- Coordinates: 48°52′08″N 112°20′32″W
- Country: United States
- State: Montana
- County: Glacier

Area
  - Total: 0.25 sq mi (0.65 km^{2})
  - Land: 0.25 sq mi (0.65 km^{2})
  - Water: 0 sq mi (0.00 km^{2})
- Elevation: 4,216 ft (1,285 m)

Population (2020)
  - Total: 0
  - Density: 0/sq mi (0/km^{2})
- Time zone: UTC-7 (Mountain (MST))
  - Summer (DST): UTC-6 (MDT)
- ZIP Code: 59427 (Cut Bank)
- Area code: 406
- FIPS code: 30-82635
- GNIS feature ID: 2806629

Zenith Colony is a Hutterite community and census-designated place (CDP) in Glacier County, Montana, United States. It is in the northeastern part of the county, 17 miles (27 km) north of Cut Bank.

Zenith Colony was first listed as a CDP prior to the 2020 census.

As of the 2020 census, Zenith Colony had a population of 0.

== Demographics ==
Historical population
Census	Pop.	Note	%±
2020	0		—
U.S. Decennial Census
