= Blackfeet Nation =

Indian tribe in Montana, United States

Coordinates: 48°39′31″N 112°52′18″W

Blackfeet Nation Aamsskáápipikani / ǎmssk̇ǎaṗiiṗiik̇ǔni, Pikuni / ṗiik̇ǔni
- Indian reservation
- Blackfeet Tribe of the Blackfeet Indian Reservation of Montana
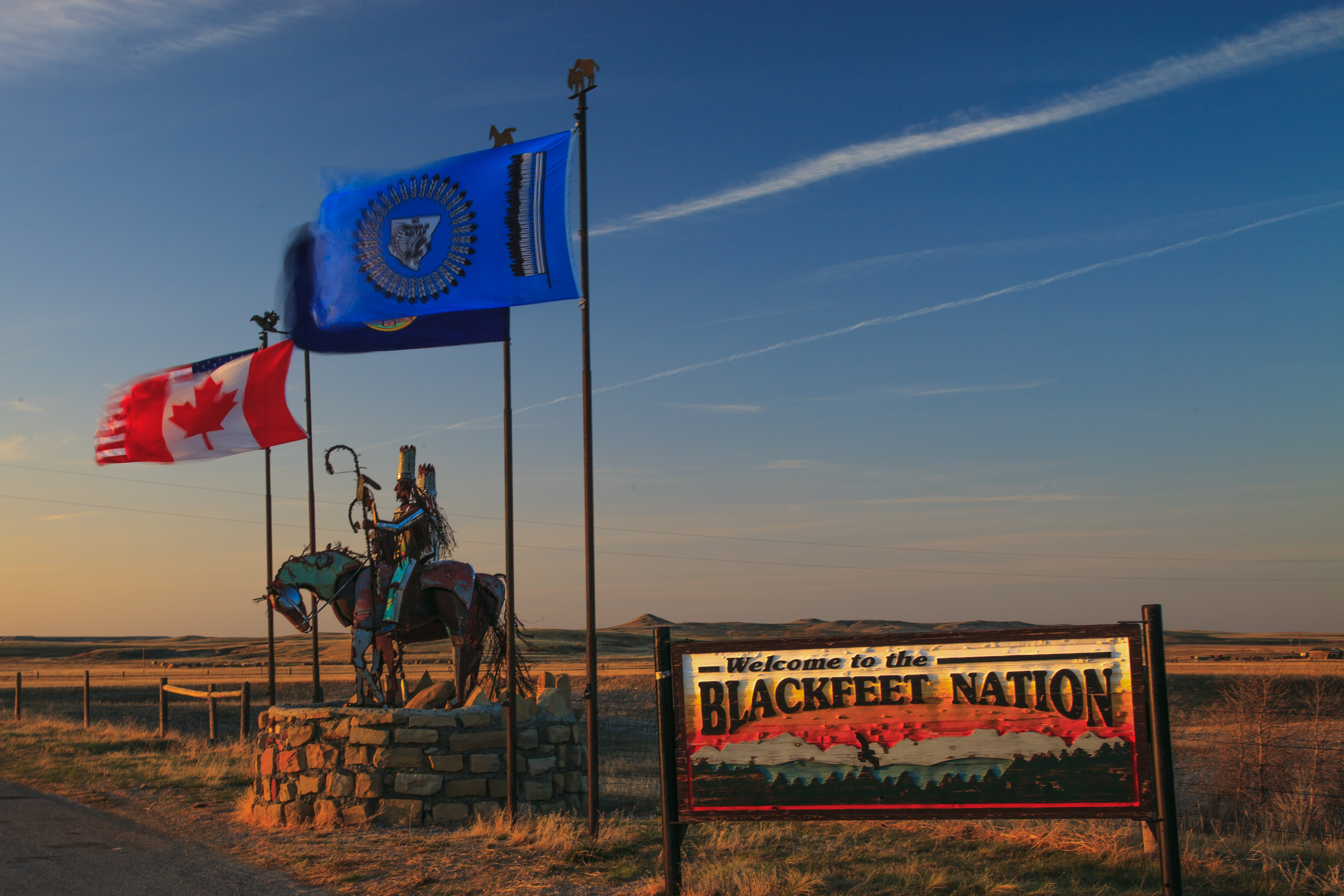
- Northern boundary of the Blackfeet Tribe, Montana

- Location in Montana
- Tribe: Blackfoot (Niitsitapi)
- Country: United States
- State: Montana
- Counties: Glacier; Pondera
- Headquarters: Browning

Government
  - Body: Vern Timmerman
  - Chairman: Illiff "Scott" Kipp Sr. (Acting)
  - Vice-Chairman: Lauren Monroe Jr

Area
  - Total: 2,285.4 sq mi (5,919.1 km^{2})
  - Fee lands: 827.85 sq mi (2,144.13 km^{2})
- Highest elevation: 9,066 ft (2,763 m)
- Lowest elevation: 3,400 ft (1,000 m)

Population (2024)
  - Total: 17,321
  - Density: 7.5791/sq mi (2.9263/km^{2})
- Website: blackfeetnation.com

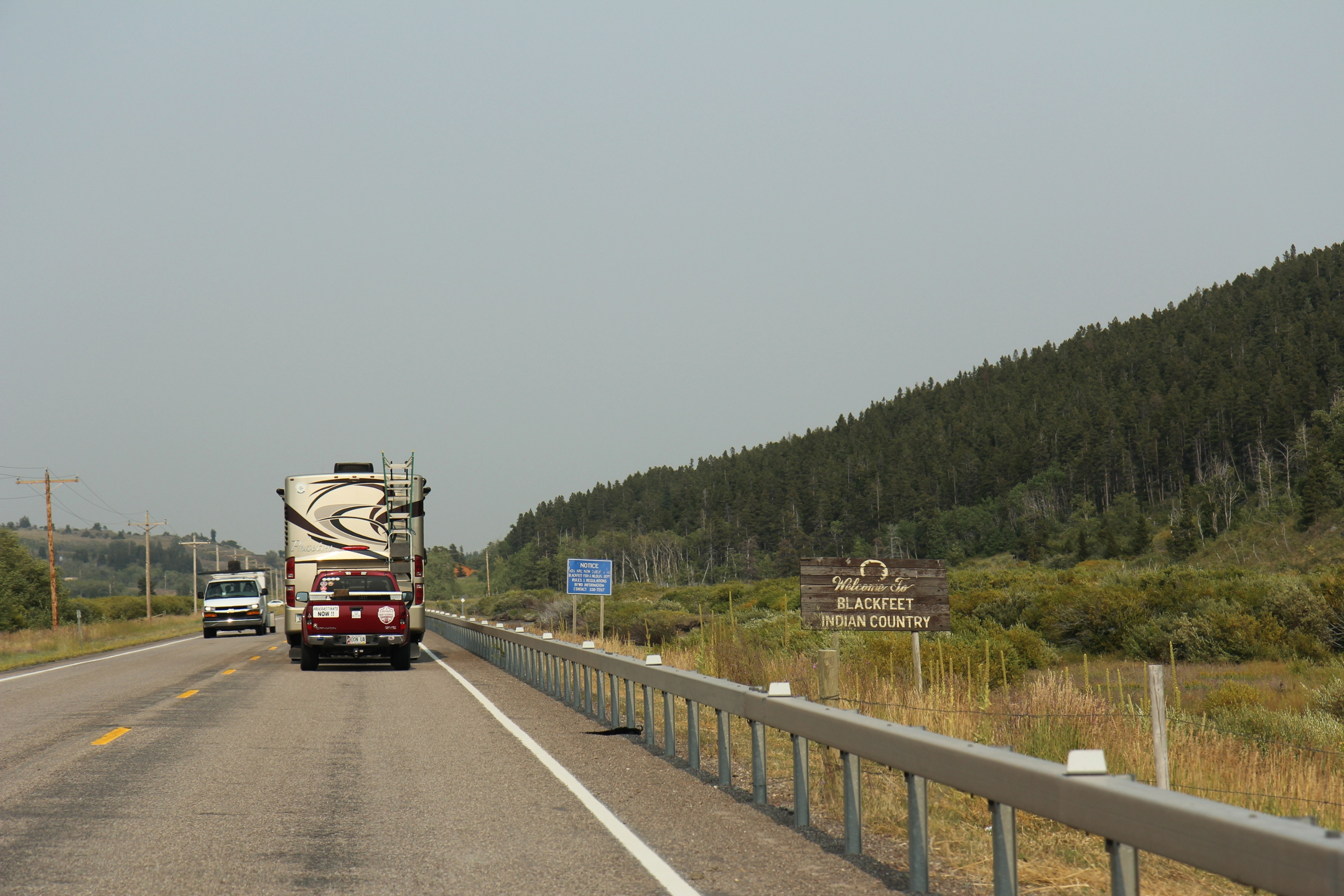
Entering the reservation on U.S. Route 2

The Blackfeet Nation (Blackfoot: Aamsskáápipikani / ǎmssk̇ǎaṗiiṗiik̇ǔni, Pikuni / ṗiik̇ǔni), officially named the Blackfeet Tribe of the Blackfeet Indian Reservation of Montana, is a federally recognized tribe of Siksikaitsitapi people with an Indian reservation in Montana. Tribal members primarily belong to the Piegan Blackfeet (Ampskapi Piikani) band of the larger Blackfoot Confederacy that spans Canada and the United States.

The Blackfeet Indian Reservation is located east of Glacier National Park and borders Alberta. Cut Bank Creek and Birch Creek form part of its eastern and southern borders. The reservation contains 3,000 square miles (7,800 km^{2}), twice the size of the national park and larger than the state of Delaware. It is located in parts of Glacier and Pondera counties.

== History ==
The Blackfeet have lived on the Northern Great Plains for thousands of years. Through raids in the Southern Plains and trade with the Cree, they eventually acquired firearms and horses. They were a powerful force on the Great Plains, controlling an area that extended from North of current day Edmonton, Alberta Province, as far South as to Yellowstone National Park; and as far West from Glacier Park all the way East to the Black Hills of South Dakota. After contact with settlers, they increasingly kept to the most Western regions of their territory and slowly exited what is now Eastern Montana and Western Saskatchewan. The Badger Two Medicine area, south of Glacier Park, was and remains an especially sacred site for the tribe.

During the late 19th century, Blackfeet territory was encroached on and annexed by European Americans and Canadians, who eventually forced the Blackfeet to cede their lands. The Blackfeet moved to smaller Indian reservations in the United States and reserves in Canada. Adjacent to their reservation, established by Treaty of 1896, are two federally controlled areas: the Lewis and Clark National Forest, set up in 1896, which contains the Badger-Two Medicine area, an area of 200 square miles (520 km^{2}); and Glacier National Park, both part of the tribal nation's former territory. The Badger-Two Medicine area is sacred to the Blackfeet people. This sacred part of the Rocky Mountain Front was excluded from Blackfeet lands in a Treaty of 1896, but they reserved uninhibited access for hunting, foraging, and fishing rights. Since the early 1980s, when the Bureau of Land Management illegally sold drilling rights leases without consultation with the tribe (violating both treaty law and the U.S. Environmental Protections Act), the Blackfeet have worked to prevent ecological harm to land they know as sacred and roll back the leases.

The United States federal government temporarily suspended most leasing activities for drilling in this area in the 1990s, and in 2007 the Bush administration made permanent a moratorium on issuing new permits. Many leaseholders had already voluntarily relinquished their leases, and in November 2016 the Department of Interior announced the cancellation of the 15 drilling rights leases held by Devon Energy Corporation in the Badger-Two Medicine area. The Blackfeet had documented that the area was not a "wilderness," as the Bob Marshall Wilderness Complex was designated in 1964, but a "human landscape" shaped by and integral to their culture. There was one remaining oil lease credited to the name of Solenex LLC which refused to give up its lease. In June 2020, a court ruled in favor of the Blackfeet Nation and maintained that Solenex cannot drill in the Badger Two Medicine. Later, during the Biden administration in 2021, a federal appeals court overturned the ruling and further authorized Solenex to drill. Tribal lawyers worked with a coalition of other tribes and nonprofits to settle with Solenex. In 2023, they settled for $2.3 million, ending all of Solenex's current and future activities on the land. The Blackfeet then coalesced a wide-ranging group of stakeholders, including tribal representatives, to oversee further stewardship and conservation of the Badger Two Medicine.

In September 2014, the Blackfeet Nation became one of the original eight signatories to the Buffalo Treaty and the signing ceremony was held on their reservation.

== Geography ==
Elevations in the reservation range from a low of 3,400 feet (1,000 m) to a high of 9,066 feet (2,763 m) at Chief Mountain. Adjacent mountains include Ninaki Mountain and Papoose. The eastern part of the reservation is mostly open hills of grassland, while a narrow strip along the western edge is covered by forests of fir and spruce. Free-ranging cattle are present in several areas, sometimes including on roadways.

Several waterways drain the area with the largest being the St. Mary River, Two Medicine River, Milk River, Birch Creek and Cut Bank Creek. There are 175 miles (282 km) of streams and eight major lakes on the reservation.

The reservation is east of the Lewis and Clark National Forest in Montana, which contains the Badger-Two Medicine area, sacred to the Blackfeet people. The Badger-Two Medicine area is at the Rocky Mountain Front of the national forest. The Blackfeet call the Rocky Mountains the "Backbone of the World". Their names for peaks include Morning Star, Poia, Little Plume, Running Crane, Spotted Eagle, Kiyo, Scarface, Elkcalf Bullshoe, and Curly Bear.

== Demographics ==
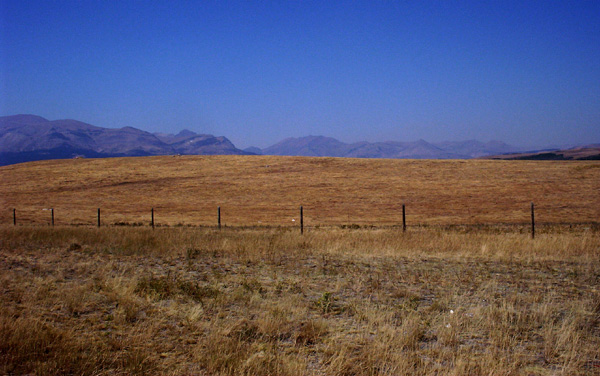
Blackfeet Indian Reservation, looking at the mountains of Glacier National Park

The 2010 census reported a population of 10,405 living on the reservation lands. The population density is 3.47 people per square mile (1.34 people/km^{2}).

The Blackfeet Nation has 16,500 enrolled members. The main community is Browning, Montana, which is the seat of tribal government. Other towns serve the tourist economy along the edge of the park: St. Mary and East Glacier Park Village, which has an Amtrak passenger station and the historic Glacier Park Lodge. Small communities include Babb, Kiowa, Blackfoot, Seville, Heart Butte, Starr School, and Glacier Homes.

=== Communities ===
- Babb
- Browning
- East Glacier Park Village
- Heart Butte
- Little Browning
- North Browning
- St. Mary
- South Browning
- Starr School

== Culture ==
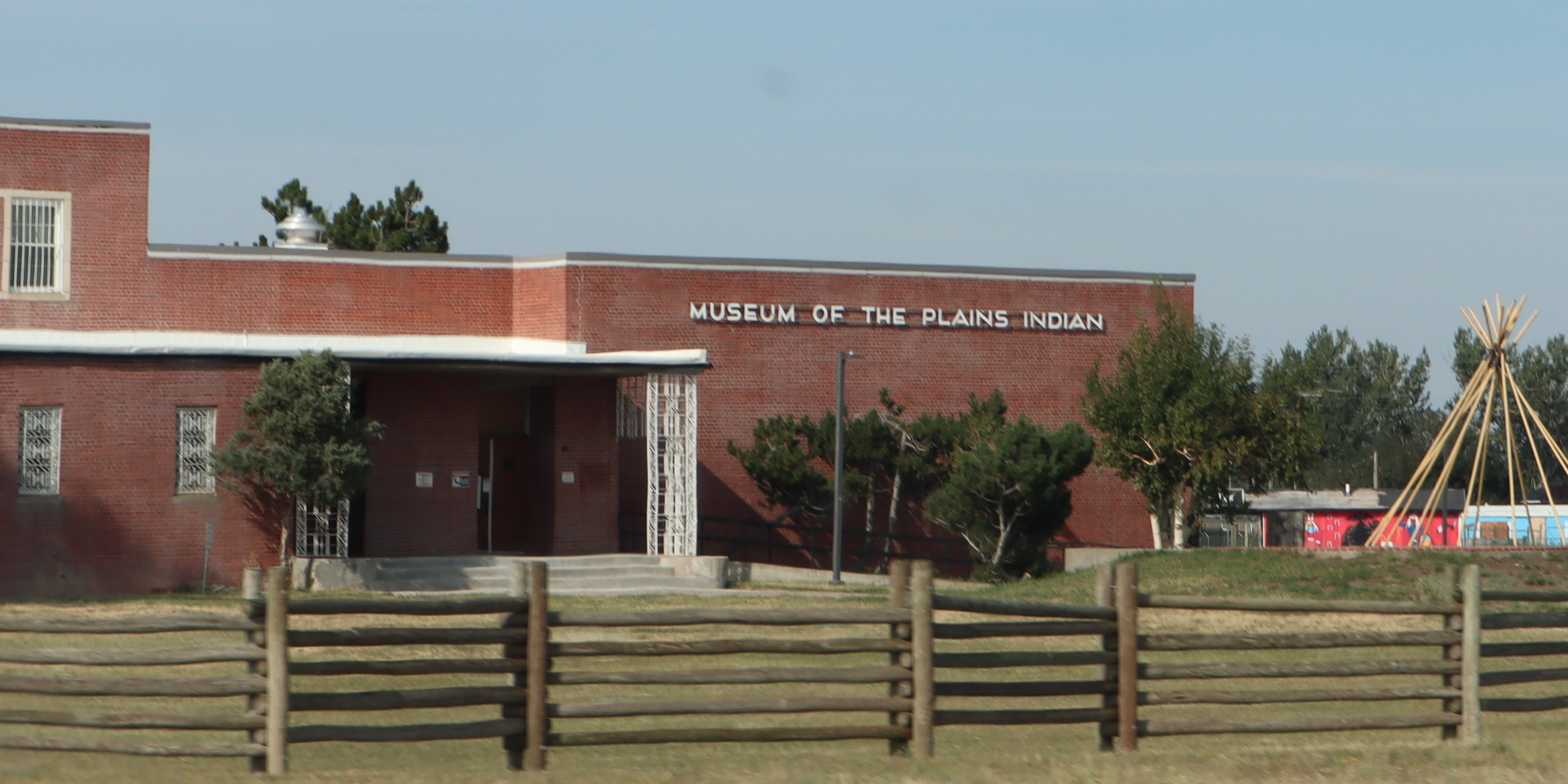
Museum of the Plains Indian in 2026

The tribe believes it has an oral history of 10,000 years in this region that recounts the sacred nature of their central place, the Badger-Two Medicine area, known as their site of creation and origin.

The Rocky Mountain Front near Birch Creek The Badger-Two Medicine is "covered by the Treaty of 1896, which gives Blackfeet tribal members the right to hunt and fish in any portion of the area in accordance with state law and cut wood for domestic use. Blackfeet treaty claims as well as spiritual and cultural uses of the Badger-Two Medicine are pre-existing rights.

In 2002, the Department of Interior declared roughly two-thirds — almost 90,000 acres (36,000 ha) — of the Badger-Two Medicine area along the Rocky Mountain Front as eligible for listing as a Traditional Cultural District in the National Register of Historic Places. This was a recognition of its importance to the Blackfeet. They used an ethnographer to document their oral history of use and practices, and in 2014 used this information to negotiate with stakeholders over leases for drilling rights that had been made in the area.

The Blackfeet celebrate North American Indian Days, an annual festival held on pow wow grounds, near the Museum of the Plains Indian in Browning. Adjacent to the reservation's eastern edge is the city of Cut Bank.

=== Mythology ===
There are a vast array of myths surrounding the Blackfoot Native Americans as well as Aboriginal people. These stories, myths, origins, and legends play a big role in their everyday life, such as their religion, their history, and their beliefs. Only the elders of the Blackfoot tribes are allowed to tell the tales, and are typically difficult to obtain because the elders of the tribes are often reluctant to tell them to strangers who are not of the tribe. People such as George B. Grinnell, John Maclean, D.C. Duvall, Clark Wissler, and James Willard Schultz were able to obtain and record a number of the stories that are told by the tribes.

== Economy ==
Because of its isolated location, residents of the reservation have suffered high unemployment. As of May 2016, the Montana Local Area Unemployment Statistics (LAUS) Program Preliminary Non-Seasonally Adjusted Data reports the rate is 11.0% on the reservation (for comparison, at the same time, unemployment was 3.6% for Montana and 4.5% for the U.S.).

In 2001, the BIA reported 69 percent unemployment among registered members of the tribe. Among those who were employed that year, 26% earned less than the poverty guideline.

The major income source of the reservation is petroleum and natural gas leases on the oil fields on tribal lands. In 1982, there were 643 producing oil wells and 47 producing gas wells.

The reservation also has a significant tourist industry. Other economic activities include ranching and a small lumber industry, which supported the Blackfeet Indian Writing Company pencil factory in Browning.

Farms located at least partially on the reservation reported a total income of $9 million in 2002. A total of 354 farms covered 1,291,180 acres (522,520 ha), the majority of the reservation's land. Most of these farms or ranches were family-owned, including the 198 farms owned by Native Americans.

Eighty percent of the land was used for raising beef cattle, which produced eighty percent of farm income. Other livestock included hogs, and chickens, with only small numbers of dairy cattle, bison, horses, and sheep.

Of the 245,530 acres (99,360 ha) used for growing crops, only 32,158 acres (13,014 ha), or 13%, were irrigated. Crops raised included wheat, barley, and hay with a smaller amount of oats.

Members of the tribe work seasonally in wildfire firefighting, a source of considerable individual income. In 2000, some 1,000 Blackfeet worked as firefighters, including the elite Chief Mountain Hotshots team, and brought in $6.1 million; other yearly incomes varied according to the severity of the wildfire season.

On April 30, 2010, the Blackfeet Tribal Business Council (BTBC) approved three major initiatives totaling $5.5 million. The revenue was to be derived from payments for oil exploration from Newfield Production Co. The BTBC approved a $200 special per capita payments for all 16,500 members, initial funding for a new grocery store in Browning, and more than $1 million for land acquisition within the reservation to return property to tribal control.

== Government ==
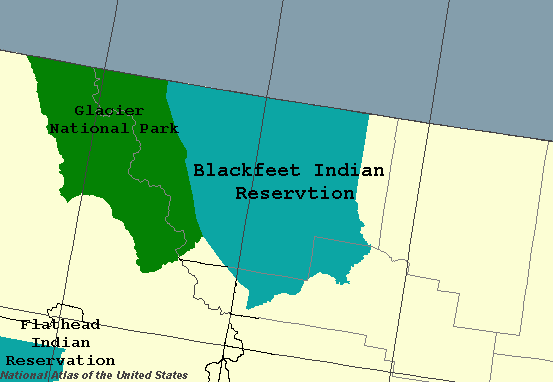
Relationship of the National Park and the reservation

The Blackfeet Nation runs the sovereign government on the reservation through its elected Tribal Business Council. For many years Earl Old Person led the council. Old Person was also the honorary chief of the tribe. It provides most services, including courts, child welfare, employment assistance, wildlife management, health care, education, land management, and senior services, as well as garbage collection and water systems. They worked with the federal Bureau of Indian Affairs to replace native police with federal officers in 2003 because of problems in the local force.

The reservation includes several types of land use. Of the total 1,462,640 acres (591,910 ha), 650,558 acres (263,271 ha) are held in trust for enrolled tribal members, 311,324 acres (125,988 ha) are held directly by the tribe, and 8,292 acres (3,356 ha) are Government Reserve, mostly irrigation projects and the Cut Bank Boarding School Reserve. The remaining 529,826 acres (214,413 ha) are Fee lands, which is taxable and may be privately owned by the tribe, tribe members or non-tribe members.

The tribe leases some of its communal land for homes, farms, grazing, and commercial uses. They offer leases to tribe members prior to non-members. The tribe has the right of first refusal; all private land offered for sale within the reservation must be offered to the tribe first. If they decline to purchase it, they grant a waiver permitting purchase by non-Native parties.

Map of the Blackfeet Indian Reservation and nearby reservations (In blue).

== Transportation ==
There are no paved north–south roads in Glacier National Park. Access to sites on the east side of the park is provided by U.S. Route 89, which runs through the reservation to the Canada–US border, crossing near Chief Mountain. It provides access to the Canadian sister national park, Waterton Lakes. Both east–west routes for the park travel through the reservation, as does the passenger train service on Amtrak's Empire Builder. Several hiking trails continue out of the park and across the reservation; they require Blackfeet-issued permits for use.

== Education ==
The portions of the reservation in Glacier County are in multiple school districts: Browning Elementary School District and Browning High School District include large portions of the reservation. Other parts are in the East Glacier Park Elementary School District (which feeds into Browning HSD), Mountain View Elementary School District, Cut Bank Elementary School District, and Cut Bank High School District (Cut Bank HSD takes Cut Bank and Mountain View students).

The portion of the reservation in Pondera County is in the Heart Butte K-12 Schools school district.

== Notable people ==
- Ashley Loring Heavyrunner (1996–2017), a symbol of the Missing and Murdered Indigenous Women movement
- Black Lodge Singers, powwow singers and drum group
- Debora Juarez, member (2016-24, 2025-present) and President (2022-24) of the Seattle City Council.
- Donna Hutchinson (born 1949), elected as member of the Arkansas House of Representatives from Bella Vista, Arkansas, served from 2007 to 2013
- Earl Old Person (1929–2021), tribal chief and political leader
- Elouise P. Cobell (1945–2011), tribal treasurer and founder of Blackfeet Nation Bank.
- Gordon Belcourt (1945–2013), Executive Director of the Montana-Wyoming Tribal Leaders Council
- Gyasi Ross, Blackfeet author, attorney, rapper.
- Joe Hipp (born 1962), professional boxer
- John Two Guns White Calf (1872–1934) was a chief of the Piegan Blackfeet in Montana, the last chief of the Blackfoot Tribe, and was the model for the Washington Redskins logo.
- Lauren Chief Elk (born 1987), feminist educator and writer
- Lily Gladstone (born 1986), actress (Killers of the Flower Moon)
- Minnie Spotted-Wolf (1923-1987), the first Native American woman to enlist in the United States Marine Corps
- Misty Upham (1982–2014), actor
- Mountain Chief (1848–1942)
- Richie Havens (1941–2013), singer-songwriter and guitarist
- Rickey Medlocke (born 1950), guitarist for Blackfoot and Lynyrd Skynyrd bands
- Running Eagle (birth unknown, died after 1878), notable female warrior
- Stephen Graham Jones (born 1972), author
- Steve Reevis (1962–2017), actor (Geronimo: An American Legend, The Missing, Fargo)
- William "Chief" Carlson (1959 - 2003), U.S. Army Delta Force soldier and CIA Contractor with Special Activities Center killed during the War in Afghanistan (2001–2021)

== See also ==
- Tipi ring, with information about study of tipi ring sites on the Blackfeet Indian Reservation
