= Starr School, Montana =

- Census-designated place
- Location of Starr School, Montana
- Coordinates: 48°35′55″N 113°08′25″W
- Country: United States
- State: Montana
- County: Glacier

Area
  - Total: 4.23 sq mi (10.96 km^{2})
  - Land: 4.23 sq mi (10.95 km^{2})
  - Water: 0.0039 sq mi (0.01 km^{2})
- Elevation: 4,705 ft (1,434 m)

Population (2020)
  - Total: 267
  - Density: 63.2/sq mi (24.39/km^{2})
- Time zone: UTC-7 (Mountain (MST))
  - Summer (DST): UTC-6 (MDT)
- Area code: 406
- FIPS code: 30-70825
- GNIS feature ID: 2409996

Starr School is a census-designated place (CDP) in Glacier County, Montana, United States. As of the 2020 census, Starr School had a population of 267.

== Geography ==
Starr School is located northwest of Browning. It is on the Blackfeet Indian Reservation.

According to the United States Census Bureau, the CDP has a total area of 4.23 square miles (10.96 km^{2}), of which 0.004 square miles (0.01 km^{2}), or 0.09%, is water.

== Demographics ==
Historical population
Census	Pop.	Note	%±
2020	267		—
U.S. Decennial Census

As of the census of 2000, there were 248 people, 61 households, and 58 families residing in the CDP. The population density was 60.8 inhabitants per square mile (23.5/km^{2}). There were 67 housing units at an average density of 16.4/sq mi (6.3/km^{2}). The racial makeup of the CDP was 2.42% White, 97.18% Native American, and 0.40% from two or more races.

There were 61 households, out of which 49.2% had children under the age of 18 living with them, 50.8% were married couples living together, 29.5% had a female householder with no husband present, and 4.9% were non-families. 4.9% of all households were made up of individuals, and 1.6% had someone living alone who was 65 years of age or older. The average household size was 4.07 and the average family size was 4.14.

In the CDP, the population was spread out, with 42.3% under the age of 18, 11.7% from 18 to 24, 22.6% from 25 to 44, 18.1% from 45 to 64, and 5.2% who were 65 years of age or older. The median age was 23 years. For every 100 females, there were 112.0 males. For every 100 females age 18 and over, there were 95.9 males.

The median income for a household in the CDP was $24,531, and the median income for a family was $24,531. Males had a median income of $35,972 versus $31,250 for females. The per capita income for the CDP was $8,105. About 18.5% of families and 20.2% of the population were below the poverty line, including 22.5% of those under the age of eighteen and none of those 65 or over.

== Education ==
The area school district is Browning Public Schools, with its components being Browning Elementary School District and Browning High School District.
