= Minnie Spotted-Wolf =

Native American marine (1923–1988)

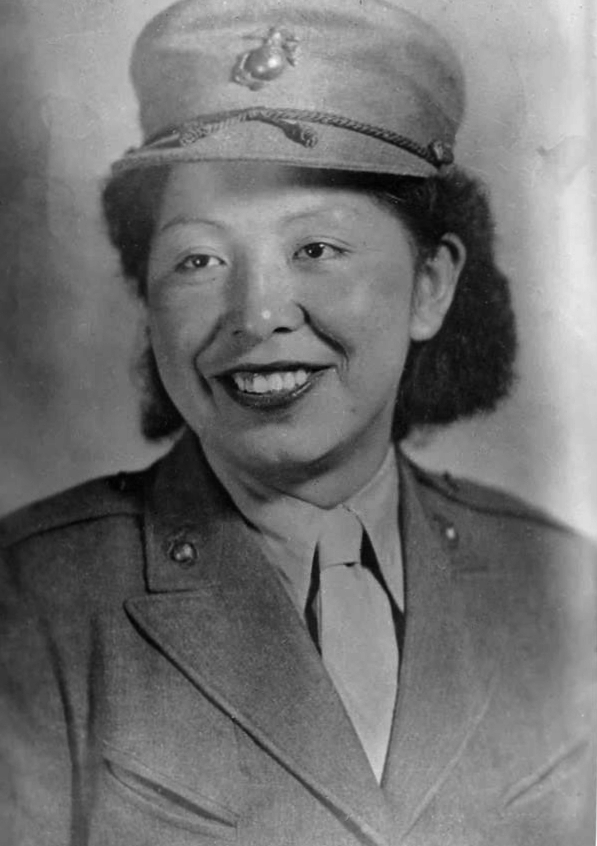
- Born: June 20, 1923; Heart Butte, Montana
- Died: July 8, 1987 (aged 64); Browning, Montana
- Alma mater: BS, Elementary Education, 1976
- Military career
- Allegiance: United States
- Branch: United States Marine Corps
- Service years: 1943–1945
- Rank: Private
- Conflicts: World War II
- Other work: Teacher

Minnie Spotted-Wolf (1923–1987) was one of the first Native American women to enlist in the United States Marine Corps.

== Biography ==
Minnie Spotted-Wolf enlisted in the Marine Corps Women's Reserve in July 1943.

Spotted-Wolf, from Heart Butte, Montana, was a member of the Blackfoot tribe. Prior to joining the Marines, she had worked on her father's ranch doing such chores as cutting fence posts, driving a two-ton truck, and breaking horses. Known for her skill for breaking horses, she described Marine boot camp as: "hard but not too hard."

She served on military bases in California and Hawaii. She worked as a heavy equipment operator and a driver for general officers.

Press coverage of her wartime service included headlines like Minnie, Pride of the Marines, Is Bronc-Busting Indian Queen.

She was discharged in 1947.

After her military service, she returned to Montana, married Robert England, earned a degree in Elementary Education, and spent 29 years as a teacher.

According to her daughter, "she could outride guys into her early 50s."

== Tribute ==
In 2019, a section of US Highway 89 in Pondera County, MT was dedicated as "Minnie Spotted-Wolf Memorial Highway”.

== See also ==
- United States Marine Corps Women's Reserve

== Sources ==
- "Circle of Honor". Native American Women with Military Service. Archived from the original on 2016-10-15.
- Simpson, Peggy (May 26, 2003). "Native American Veterans Honored Today". Women's eNews.
- Rae, Callum (29 December 2015). "Minnie Spotted Wolf". The Female Soldier.
- Holm, Tom (2007). Code Talkers and Warriors: Native Americans and World War II. New York: Chelsea House. pp. 34–35. ISBN 978-0-79-109340-5. OCLC 77270989.
