= Glacier County, Montana =

County in Montana, United States

- County
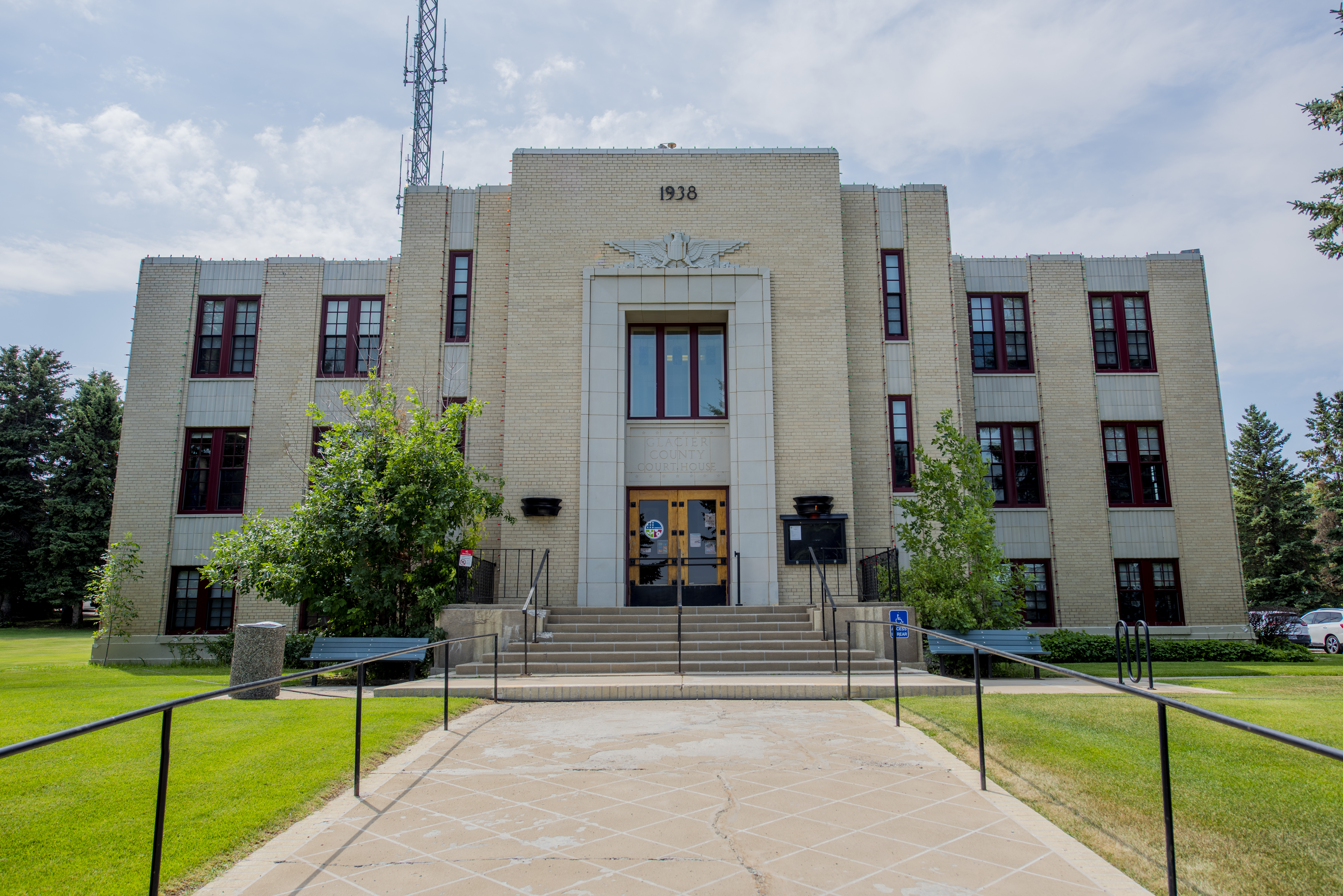
- Glacier County Courthouse in Cut Bank

- Location within the U.S. state of Montana
- Coordinates: 48°42′N 113°01′W
- Country: United States
- State: Montana
- Founded: 1919
- Named for: The glaciers in Glacier National Park
- Seat: Cut Bank
- Largest city: Cut Bank

Area
  - Total: 3,037 sq mi (7,870 km^{2})
  - Land: 2,996 sq mi (7,760 km^{2})
  - Water: 41 sq mi (110 km^{2}) 1.40%

Population (2020)
  - Total: 13,778
  - Estimate (2025): 13,463 ▼
  - Density: 4.5/sq mi (1.7/km^{2})
- Time zone: UTC−7 (Mountain)
  - Summer (DST): UTC−6 (MDT)
- Congressional district: 1st
- Website: glaciercountymt.gov
- Montana county number 38

Glacier County is located in the U.S. state of Montana. As of the 2020 census, the population was 13,778. The county is located in northwestern Montana between the Great Plains and the Rocky Mountains, known to the Blackfeet as the "Backbone of the World". The county is geographically and culturally diverse and includes the Blackfeet Indian Reservation, Glacier National Park, and Lewis and Clark National Forest. The county is bordered by 75 miles of international boundary with two ports of entry (Piegan and Del Bonita) open year-round and one seasonal (Chief Mountain) international border crossing into Alberta, Canada.

== Settlements ==
Several small unincorporated communities, one incorporated town, and one incorporated city are located within the county.

Cut Bank, the county seat with a population of around 3,000, is located in eastern Glacier County, on the edge of the Great Plains. Cut Bank arose from the railway and agricultural needs of the surrounding area, and was fostered by an oil boom in the 1920s. The town's diverse population is a result of this settlement. Town resources and services include a hospital and clinic, an historic airport (with regional and international connections), a nine-hole golf course, and a municipal swimming pool. Nearby historical sites from the Lewis and Clark expedition, among other historic and prehistoric locations, can be visited. The Glacier County Museum has a collection of archaeological artifacts, historic buildings, community memorabilia, and a comprehensive archive of early area history and individuals, including a large collection of data on Blackfeet history.

Browning is the home and government seat of the Blackfeet Tribe. The incorporated portion of Browning, at 1,400 residents, does not reflect the total population of around 7,000 in the wider community, largely representative of the Blackfeet Tribe on a part of their ancestral homeland, which dates back over 400 years. Town businesses and resources include a federal building, Blackfeet Community College, Native American Museum and Heritage Center, casino, fairgrounds, racetrack, and Native American camp area that hosts an annual Native American celebration and powwow.

Babb is a small, unincorporated farming and ranching community on the Blackfeet Indian Reservation. The community experiences a large influx of tourists in the summer months, as it is the gateway to the Many Glacier area of Glacier National Park. Community infrastructure includes one school, a US post office, a fire station, and a general store as well as a motel, gas station, several restaurants, and two churches. Nearby attractions include the aforementioned Glacier National Park, the historic Many Glacier Hotel, the St. Mary River and Irrigation Canal, and Chief Mountain, as well as the Piegan and Chief Mountain border crossings with Alberta, Canada.

East Glacier Park Village, a small winter community, grows in the summertime with many visitors and the summer workforce, hailing from all parts of the globe to meet the needs of the larger population. It is the site of the largest of Glacier Park's historic hotels and its fleet of "red buses". It has a nine-hole golf course, campgrounds, trail rides, boat rides, and native interpretive tours.

St. Mary is an unincorporated community on the western border of the Blackfeet Native American Reservation, located adjacent to Glacier National Park. The village is the eastern terminus of the Going-to-the-Sun Road which bisects the park east-to-west at a length of 53 miles (85 km). Fewer than 50 people reside in the village year-round; however, the population increases tenfold on a busy summer evening. It has several lodges, restaurants and cafés, a small grocery store, two gas stations and campgrounds. A large housing area for National Park Service personnel is located adjacent to the village, within the park. U.S. Route 89 passes through the village, which lies between Saint Mary Lake in Glacier National Park and Lower St. Mary Lake on the Blackfeet Native American Reservation.

Starr School is a census-designated place (CDP) in Glacier County. The population was 252 at the 2010 census.

== Geography ==
According to the United States Census Bureau, the county has a total area of 3,037 square miles (7,870 km^{2}), of which 2,996 square miles (7,760 km^{2}) is land and 41 square miles (110 km^{2}) (1.3%) is water. About 71% of the county's land area lies within the Blackfeet Indian Reservation. Another 21% lies within Glacier National Park in western Glacier County.

=== Adjacent counties ===
- Flathead County - west
- Pondera County - south
- Toole County - east
- Cardston County, Alberta - north
- Improvement District No. 4, Alberta (Waterton Lakes National Park) - northwest
- County of Warner No. 5, Alberta - northeast

=== National protected areas ===
- Glacier National Park (part)
- Lewis and Clark National Forest (part)

== Demographics ==
Historical population
Census	Pop.	Note	%±
1920	4,178		—
1930	5,297		26.8%
1940	9,034		70.5%
1950	9,645		6.8%
1960	11,565		19.9%
1970	10,783		−6.8%
1980	10,628		−1.4%
1990	12,121		14.0%
2000	13,247		9.3%
2010	13,399		1.1%
2020	13,778		2.8%
2025 (est.)	13,463	▼	−2.3%
U.S. Decennial Census:

=== 2020 census ===
As of the 2020 census, there were 13,778 people living in the county.

Of the residents, 31.4% were under the age of 18 and 12.7% were 65 years of age or older; the median age was 32.8 years. For every 100 females there were 95.4 males, and for every 100 females age 18 and over there were 91.9 males. 0.0% of residents lived in urban areas and 100.0% lived in rural areas.

The racial makeup of the county was 25.6% White, 0.1% Black or African American, 67.2% American Indian and Alaska Native, 0.3% Asian, 0.2% from some other race, and 6.5% from two or more races. Hispanic or Latino residents of any race comprised 2.2% of the population.

There were 4,557 households in the county, of which 41.3% had children under the age of 18 living with them and 32.2% had a female householder with no spouse or partner present. About 26.3% of all households were made up of individuals and 10.1% had someone living alone who was 65 years of age or older.

There were 5,342 housing units, of which 14.7% were vacant. Among occupied housing units, 59.1% were owner-occupied and 40.9% were renter-occupied. The homeowner vacancy rate was 1.6% and the rental vacancy rate was 5.3%.

Glacier County, Montana – Racial composition
Race (NH = Non-Hispanic)	2020	2010	2000	1990	1980
White alone (NH)	25.4% (3,496)	30.7% (4,117)	35.3% (4,675)	43.3% (5,244)	53.6% (5,693)
Black alone (NH)	0.1% (19)	0.1% (17)	0.1% (11)	0.1% (11)	0% (0)
American Indian alone (NH)	65.9% (9,085)	64.5% (8,644)	61% (8,075)	55.9% (6,773)	45.9% (4,882)
Asian alone (NH)	0.3% (39)	0.2% (26)	0.1% (8)	0.1% (10)	0% (0)
Pacific Islander alone (NH)	0.1% (16)	0% (1)	0.1% (7)		
Other race alone (NH)	0.1% (10)	0% (5)	0% (3)	0% (5)	0% (0)
Multiracial (NH)	5.9% (812)	2.6% (348)	2.3% (309)	—	—
Hispanic/Latino (any race)	2.2% (301)	1.8% (241)	1.2% (159)	0.6% (78)	0.5% (53)

The most reported ancestries in 2020 were:

- Blackfeet (61%)
- German (8.5%)
- Irish (5.2%)
- English (4.2%)
- Norwegian (2.3%)
- Mexican (1.2%)
- Scottish (1.1%)

=== 2010 census ===
As of the 2010 census, there were 13,399 people, 4,361 households, and 3,088 families residing in the county. The population density was 4.5 inhabitants per square mile (1.7/km^{2}). There were 5,348 housing units at an average density of 1.8 per square mile (0.69/km^{2}). The racial makeup of the county was 65.6% Native American, 31.1% white, 0.2% Asian, 0.1% black or African American, 0.2% from other races, and 2.8% from two or more races. Those of Hispanic or Latino origin made up 1.8% of the population. In terms of ancestry, 13.6% were German, 7.2% were Irish, 5.6% were Norwegian, and 1.4% were American.

Of the 4,361 households, 44.0% had children under the age of 18 living with them, 42.8% were married couples living together, 19.1% had a female householder with no husband present, 29.2% were non-families, and 24.9% of all households were made up of individuals. The average household size was 2.91 and the average family size was 3.49. The median age was 31.7 years.

The median income for a household in the county was $38,075 and the median income for a family was $44,397. Males had a median income of $31,700 versus $30,594 for females. The per capita income for the county was $17,053. About 21.4% of families and 25.4% of the population were below the poverty line, including 35.0% of those under age 18 and 12.9% of those age 65 or over.

== Politics ==
United States presidential election results for Glacier County, Montana
Year	Republican		Democratic		Third party(ies)	
Year	No.	%	No.	%	No.	%
1920	1,297	69.14%	531	28.30%	48	2.56%
1924	586	41.68%	511	36.34%	309	21.98%
1928	847	46.39%	976	53.45%	3	0.16%
1932	702	28.78%	1,717	70.40%	20	0.82%
1936	781	23.92%	2,453	75.13%	31	0.95%
1940	1,352	35.96%	2,399	63.80%	9	0.24%
1944	1,228	36.34%	2,142	63.39%	9	0.27%
1948	1,238	35.29%	2,238	63.80%	32	0.91%
1952	2,061	54.68%	1,698	45.05%	10	0.27%
1956	2,054	52.99%	1,822	47.01%	0	0.00%
1960	1,775	43.95%	2,260	55.95%	4	0.10%
1964	1,458	39.44%	2,218	59.99%	21	0.57%
1968	1,643	44.76%	1,723	46.94%	305	8.31%
1972	2,143	56.11%	1,469	38.47%	207	5.42%
1976	1,892	50.81%	1,755	47.13%	77	2.07%
1980	2,283	55.78%	1,394	34.06%	416	10.16%
1984	2,228	50.24%	2,167	48.86%	40	0.90%
1988	1,728	43.16%	2,151	53.72%	125	3.12%
1992	1,222	28.27%	2,076	48.02%	1,025	23.71%
1996	1,270	31.01%	2,292	55.97%	533	13.02%
2000	1,709	41.44%	2,211	53.61%	204	4.95%
2004	1,828	40.07%	2,641	57.89%	93	2.04%
2008	1,451	29.19%	3,423	68.86%	97	1.95%
2012	1,415	31.76%	2,924	65.63%	116	2.60%
2016	1,620	31.92%	3,121	61.50%	334	6.58%
2020	1,884	33.54%	3,610	64.27%	123	2.19%
2024	1,939	38.18%	2,933	57.76%	206	4.06%

Owing largely to its majority Native American population, Glacier County generally votes strongly Democratic, in contrast with most other rural Montana counties, which trend Republican. Democratic strength lies in the western and central portions of the county in the Blackfeet Reservation, including the city of Browning. However, the eastern portion of the county, including Cut Bank, votes strongly Republican. In most recent elections, Glacier has been the most Democratic county in the state.

In the 2024 election, Glacier county saw a shift toward the Republican party, the strongest such shift of all Montana counties. This mirrored other counties in Montana with high Native American populations, such as Blaine, Roosevelt and Big Horn, which all flipped or leaned more Republican after 2020. While Kamala Harris still easily won the county, this was the first time that Glacier County voted to the right of Missoula County since 1980.

== Communities ==
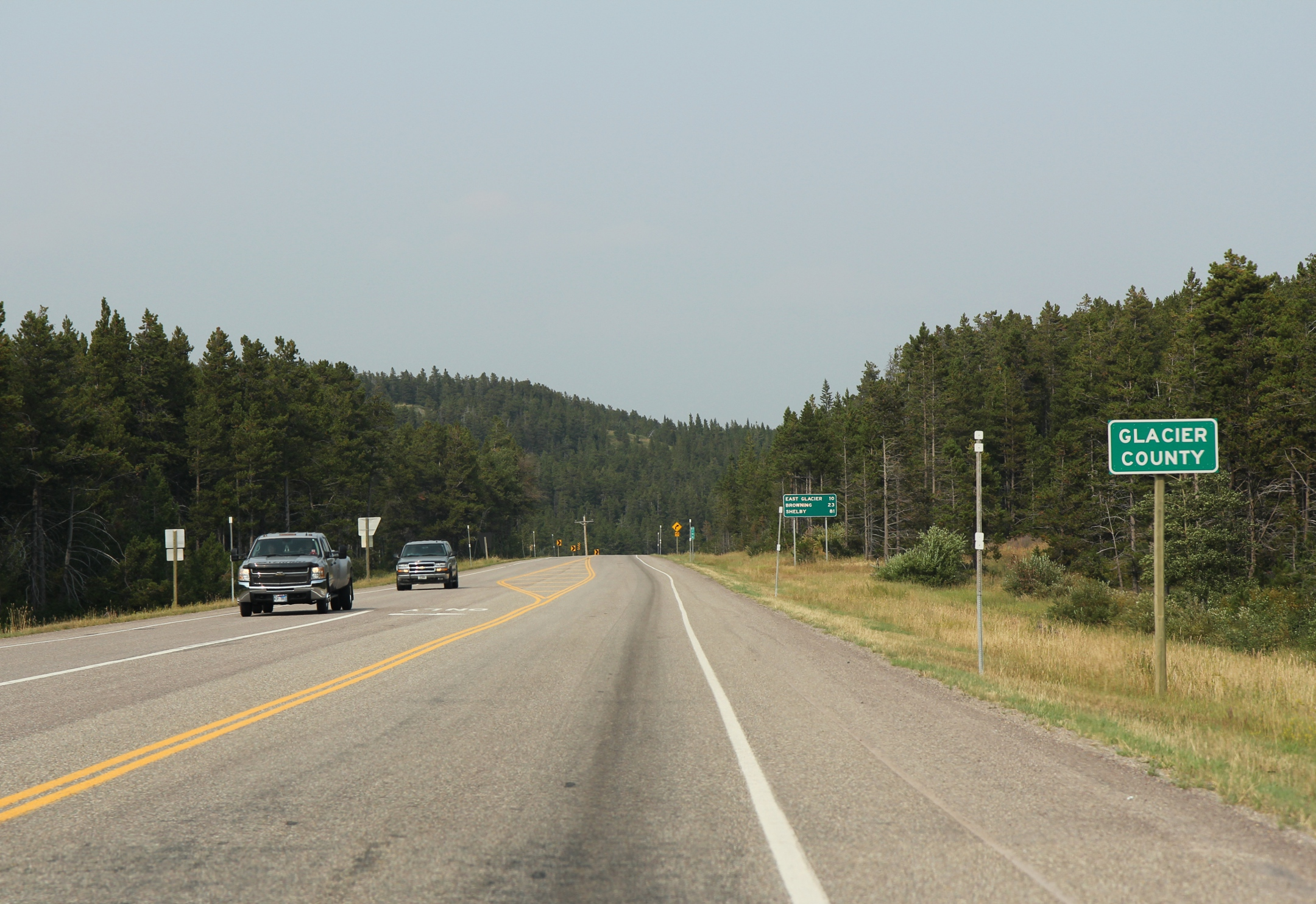
The sign for Glacier County on U.S. Route 2

=== City ===
- Cut Bank (county seat)

=== Census-designated places ===
- Babb
- Big Sky Colony
- Blackfoot
- East Glacier Park Village
- Glacier Colony
- Glendale Colony
- Hidden Lake Colony
- Horizon Colony
- Little Browning
- North Browning
- Santa Rita
- Seville Colony
- South Browning
- St. Mary
- Starr School
- Zenith Colony

=== Unincorporated communities ===
- Bison
- False Summit
- Fort Piegan
- Gunsight
- Kiowa
- Meriwether
- Piegan
- Rising Sun
- Star
- Summit
- Sundance
- Swift Current
- Browning

== Education ==
High school districts include:

- Browning High School District
- Cut Bank High School District

Elementary school districts include:

- Browning Elementary School District
- Cut Bank Elementary School District
- East Glacier Park Elementary School District
- Mountain View Elementary School District

== See also ==
- List of lakes in Glacier County, Montana
- List of mountains in Glacier County, Montana
- National Register of Historic Places listings in Glacier County, Montana
