= Heart Butte, Montana =

Census–designated place in Pondera County, Montana

Heart Butte, Montana Moskizipahpi-istaki
- CDP
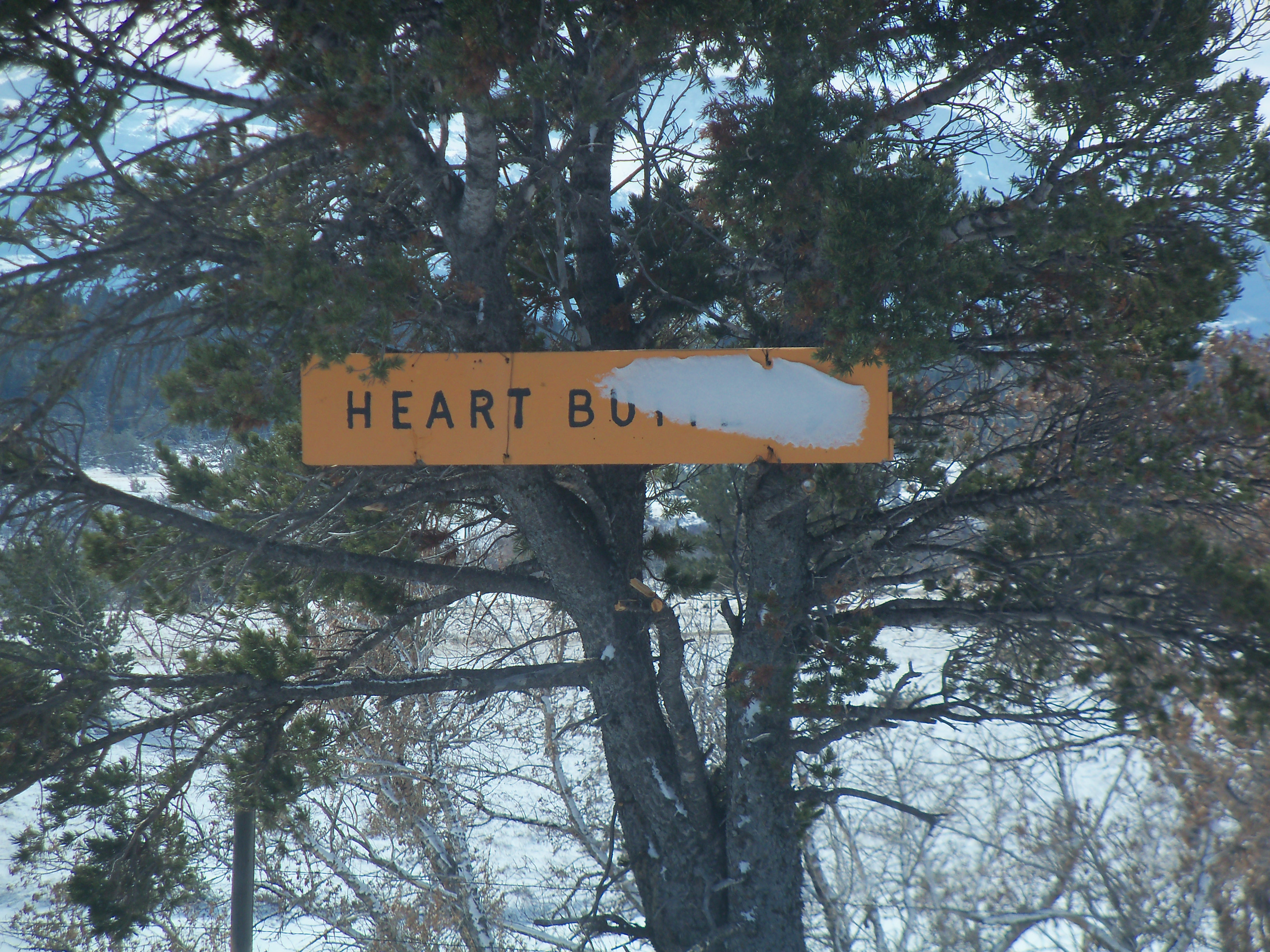

- Location of Heart Butte, Montana
- Coordinates: 48°17′26″N 112°50′11″W
- Country: United States
- State: Montana
- County: Pondera

Area
  - Total: 4.58 sq mi (11.86 km^{2})
  - Land: 4.56 sq mi (11.82 km^{2})
  - Water: 0.015 sq mi (0.04 km^{2})
- Elevation: 4,446 ft (1,355 m)

Population (2020)
  - Total: 621
  - Density: 136.1/sq mi (52.53/km^{2})
- Time zone: UTC-7 (Mountain (MST))
  - Summer (DST): UTC-6 (MDT)
- ZIP code: 59448
- Area code: 406
- FIPS code: 30-35350
- GNIS feature ID: 2408365

Heart Butte (Blackfeet: Moskizipahpi-istaki / Moskitsipahpiistaki) is a census-designated place (CDP) in Pondera County, Montana, United States. As of the 2020 census, Heart Butte had a population of 621. The town is on the Blackfeet Indian Reservation.

The town takes its name from the small heart-shaped peak southwest of town.

== Geography ==
According to the United States Census Bureau, the CDP has a total area of 4.5 square miles (12 km^{2}), of which 4.5 square miles (12 km^{2}) is land and 0.04 square miles (0.10 km^{2}) (0.44%) is water.

== Demographics ==
Historical population
Census	Pop.	Note	%±
2020	621		—
U.S. Decennial Census

As of the census of 2000, there were 698 people, 164 households, and 142 families residing in the CDP. The population density was 154.9 inhabitants per square mile (59.8/km^{2}). There were 185 housing units at an average density of 41.1 per square mile (15.9/km^{2}). The racial makeup of the town is 4.73% White, 0.14% African American, 93.70% Native American, 0.29% Asian, 0.00% Pacific Islander, 0.00% from other races, and 1.15% from two or more races. 1.15% of the population are Hispanic or Latino of any race.

There were 164 households, out of which 59.1% had children under the age of 18 living with them, 53.7% were married couples living together, 26.2% had a female householder with no husband present, and 13.4% were non-families. 12.8% of all households were made up of individuals, and 3.0% had someone living alone who was 65 years of age or older. The average household size was 4.16 and the average family size was 4.56.

In the CDP, the population was spread out, with 44.1% under the age of 18, 9.9% from 18 to 24, 26.1% from 25 to 44, 15.6% from 45 to 64, and 4.3% who were 65 years of age or older. The median age was 21 years. For every 100 females, there were 94.4 males. For every 100 females age 18 and over, there were 96.0 males.

The median income for a household in the CDP was $20,885, and the median income for a family was $20,990. Males had a median income of $24,375 versus $20,000 for females. The per capita income for the CDP was $6,845. About 42.0% of families and 44.7% of the population were below the poverty line, including 50.7% of those under age 18 and 57.7% of those age 65 or over.

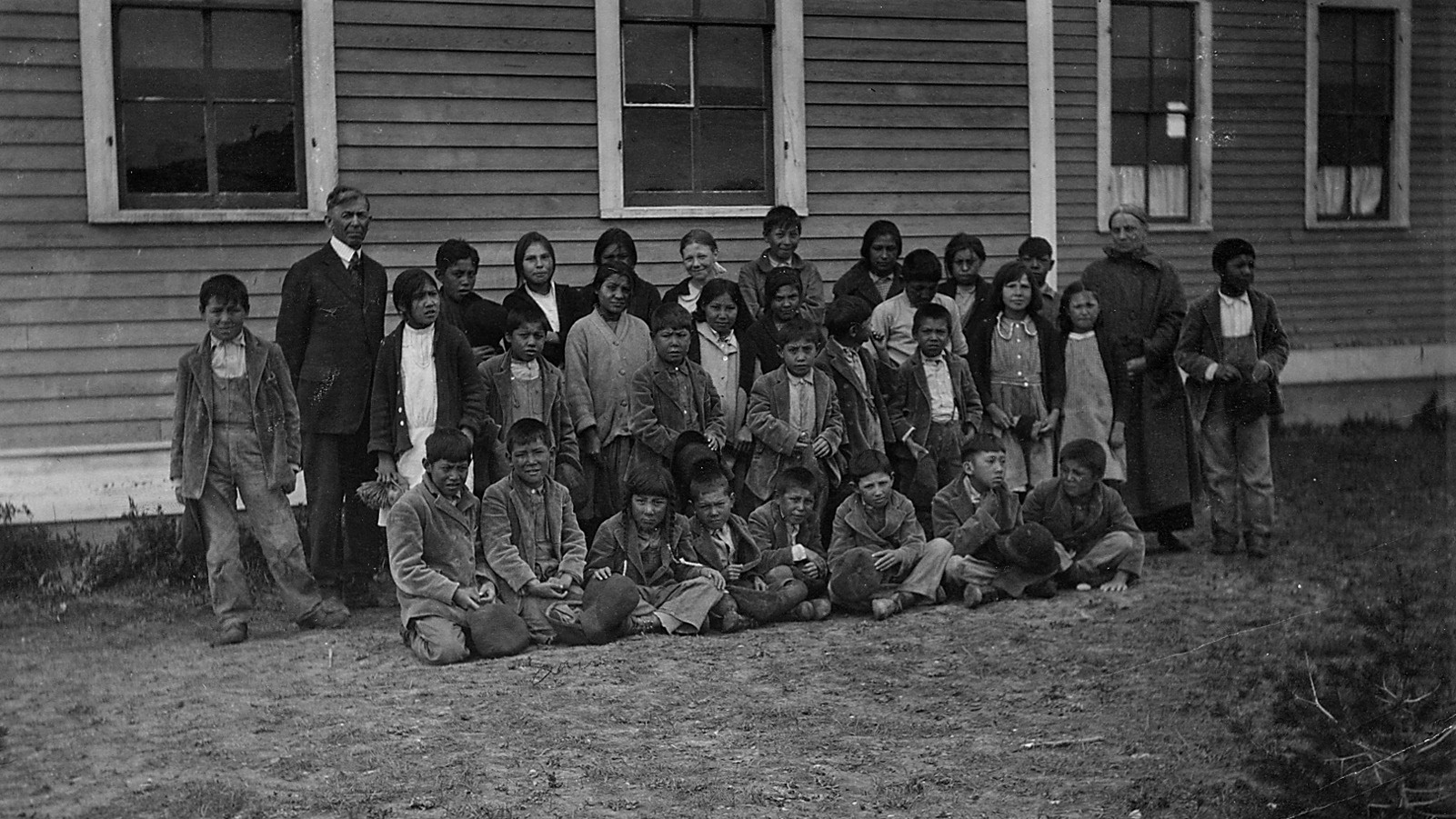
Heart Butte Day School, 1921

== Education ==
It is in the Heart Butte K-12 Schools school district.

Heart Butte School educates students from kindergarten through 12th grade. Heart Butte High School's team name is the Warriors.

== Notable people ==
- Ashley Loring Heavyrunner, symbol of the Missing and Murdered Indigenous Women movement
- Minnie Spotted-Wolf, the first Native American woman to enlist in the United States Marine Corps
