= Little Browning, Montana =

- Census-designated place
- Location within Montana Location within the United States
- Coordinates: 48°37′24″N 112°21′01″W
- Country: United States
- State: Montana
- County: Glacier

Area
  - Total: 0.75 sq mi (1.94 km^{2})
  - Land: 0.73 sq mi (1.88 km^{2})
  - Water: 0.023 sq mi (0.06 km^{2})
- Elevation: 3,694 ft (1,126 m)

Population (2020)
  - Total: 218
  - Density: 300.3/sq mi (115.93/km^{2})
- Time zone: UTC-7 (Mountain (MST))
  - Summer (DST): UTC-6 (MDT)
- Area code: 406
- FIPS code: 30-43835
- GNIS feature ID: 2583824

Little Browning is a census-designated place (CDP) in Glacier County, Montana, United States. As of the 2020 census, Little Browning had a population of 218.

== Demographics ==
Historical population
Census	Pop.	Note	%±
2020	218		—
U.S. Decennial Census

== Education ==
The area school district is Cut Bank Public Schools, with its components being Cut Bank Elementary School District and Cut Bank High School District.
