= Lea Whitford =

American politician

Member of the Montana Senate from the 8th district
- In office January 5, 2015 – January 7, 2019
- Preceded by: Shannon Augare
- Succeeded by: Susan Webber

Member of the Montana House of Representatives from the 16th district
- In office January 7, 2013 – January 5, 2015
- Preceded by: Lila Evans
- Succeeded by: Susan Webber

Personal details
- Party: Democratic
- Education: Montana State University–Northern; Montana State University
- Occupation: Educator

Lea Whitford is a Democratic member of the Montana Senate who represented the 8th District from 2015 to 2019. She was previously a member of the Montana House of Representatives for the 16th District from 2013 to 2015. She defeated former representative Lila Evans in 2012 by a margin of 1,823 to 935.

She is a member of the Blackfeet Nation, and lives on a ranch in Cut Bank, Montana. She has taught at Blackfeet Community College and Browning High School in Browning, Montana.

== See also ==
- List of Native American politicians
- Native American women in politics
