= Thomas Little Shell =

19th-century Ojibwa tribal leader

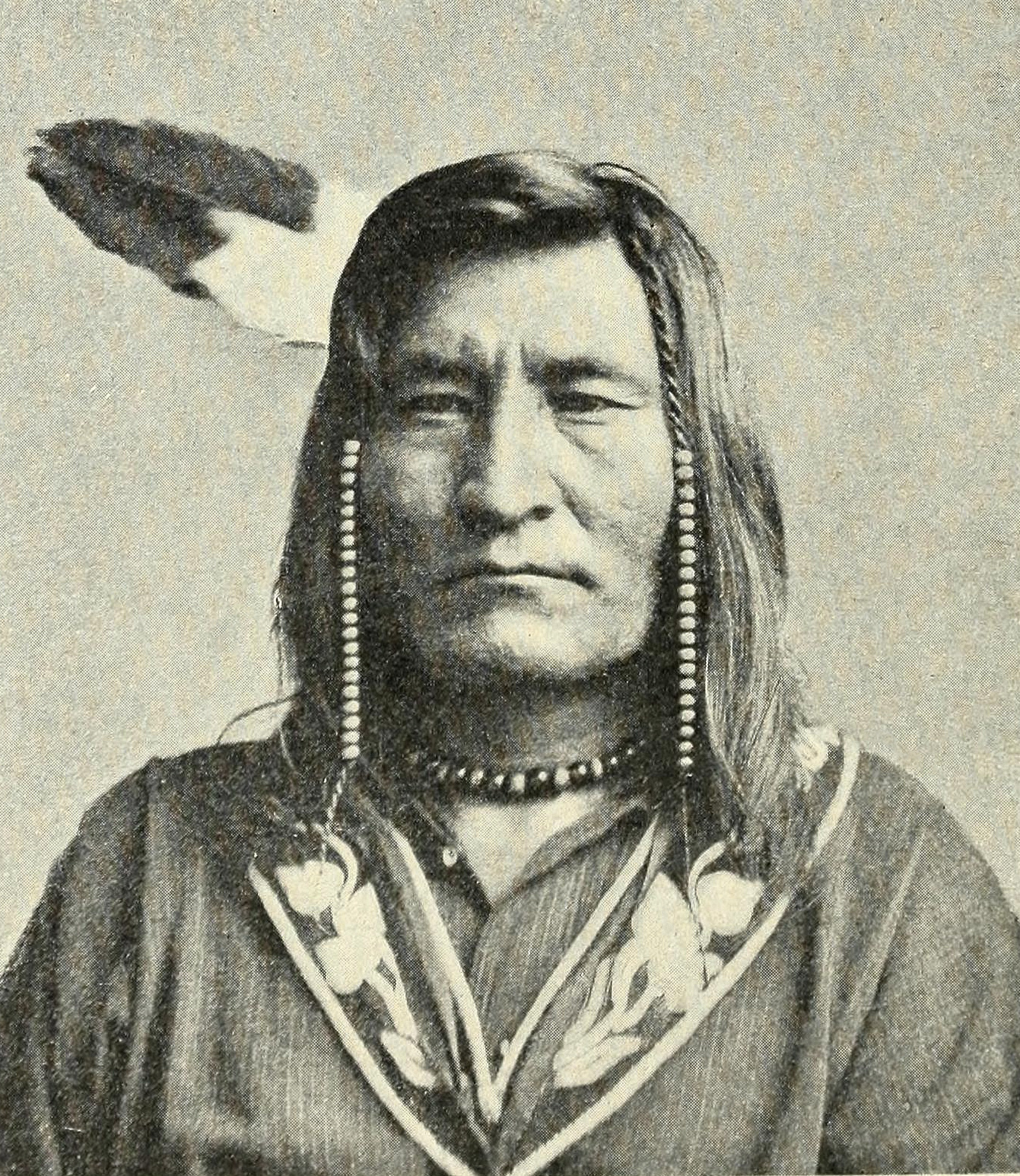
Portrait of Little Shell, c. 1892

Thomas Little Shell III (c. 1830 – 1901) (Anishinaabemowin Esens ("Little Shell" or "Little Clam") and recorded as Ase-anse or Es-sence) was a chief of a band of the Ojibwa (Chippewa) tribe in the second half of the nineteenth century, when the Anishinaabeg (Ojibwa peoples) had a vast territory ranging from southwestern Canada into the northern tier of the United States, from the Dakotas and into Montana.

== Negotiations ==
=== 1850s to 1870s ===
During the 1850s, the United States (US) began to negotiate with the Anishinaabeg of North Dakota to get them to cede their land in exchange for payment and settlement on a reservation.

Much earlier, probably during the mid or early 18th century, the Anishinaabeg had begun to migrate into the Great Plains of Canada and the United States from their historic territory around the Great Lakes, partly in response to encroachment by Europeans and Americans. By the time Canadian and United States immigrants made their first permanent settlements in the Pembina and Saulteaux lands on the plains, the Ojibwe territory had advanced to southeastern Alberta and much of present-day Montana.

Little Shell was one of the Anishinaabe signatories of the 1863 Treaty of Old Crossing, which ceded Anishinaabe land in Minnesota and North Dakota. In 1864 he refused to negotiate with the United States further about ceding more land. For almost another 30 years, Little Shell refused to negotiate with the United States over land. Together the Anishinaabeg occupied an area of over 63,000,000 acres (250,000 km^{2}). Much of that land was in North Dakota and South Dakota, but also included Pembina land in Montana, which may have reached all the way to the Rocky Mountains.

=== 1880 to 1901 ===
Around 1880, Little Shell moved his band from southern Canada to the Turtle Mountains of north-central North Dakota, where he protested encroachment by Americans and the government's lack of concern for Chippewa land title. Because of persistent food shortages, he and his band hunted buffalo as far as Montana and southern Saskatchewan during the late 1880s. When they returned to the Turtle Mountains in the early 1890s, they faced a series of events that led to the exile of Little Shell's and other Chippewa people from the Dakotas.

In 1892 Little Shell met with American representatives and attempted to reach an agreement about ceding his people's remaining land. European-American immigrants did not wait for treaties but squatted on Native American lands in Montana, North Dakota and South Dakota.

Little Shell attempted to sell his remaining lands for $1.00 per acre and be allowed to have at least 10,000,000 acres (40,000 km^{2}) of remaining lands in Montana, North Dakota and South Dakota set aside as a Reservation. The Americans offered to pay 10 cents an acre (which became known as the infamous "Ten-Cent Treaty") and refused to set aside the 10,000,000 acres (40,000 km^{2}) reservation. No agreement was reached. The United States agent brought in 32 other Chippewa leaders who signed the treaty.

Little Shell's Montana lands started at the Missouri River on the Montana-North Dakota border, then followed the Yellowstone River to its beginning, and probably included the Big Belt Mountains and Little Belt Mountains, and may have reached to the Rocky Mountains near Augusta. Of course, the plains Anishinaabeg shared their Montana lands with the Assiniboine and probably the Gros Ventre, as well.

== See also ==
- Native Americans in the United States
- Chippewa Cree
- Little Shell Tribe of Chippewa Indians
- Little Shell Band of Chippewa Indians
- Turtle Mountain Band of Chippewa Indians
