= Browning, Montana =

- Census-designated place
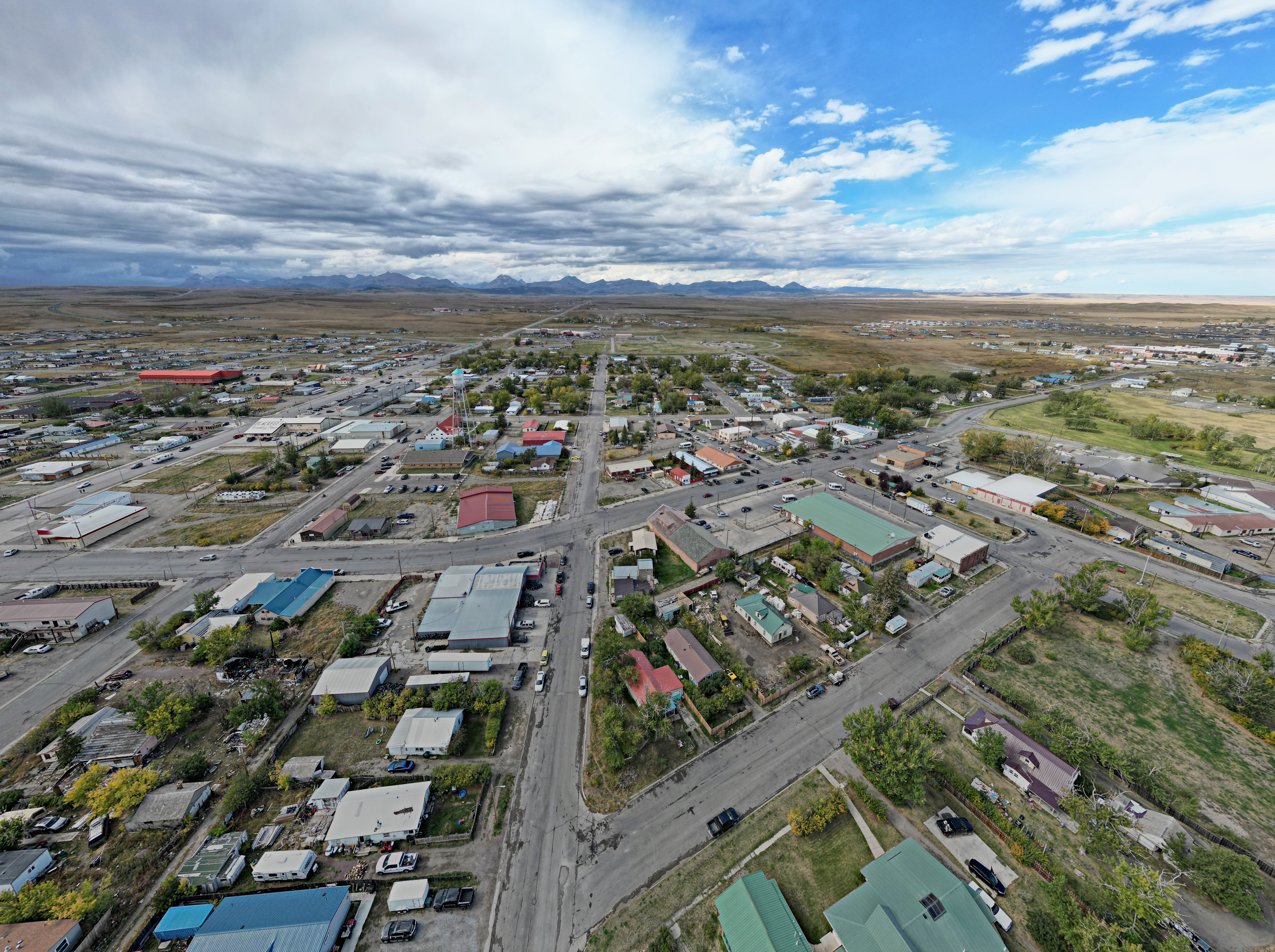
- Downtown Browning in September 2022. Photo by Lukas Eddy

- Location of Browning, Montana
- Coordinates: 48°33′23″N 113°00′54″W
- Country: United States
- State: Montana
- County: Glacier

Area
  - Total: 0.28 sq mi (0.72 km^{2})
  - Land: 0.28 sq mi (0.72 km^{2})
  - Water: 0 sq mi (0.00 km^{2})
- Elevation: 4,377 ft (1,334 m)

Population (2020)
  - Total: 1,018
  - Density: 3,683.8/sq mi (1,422.32/km^{2})
- Time zone: UTC-7 (Mountain (MST))
  - Summer (DST): UTC-6 (MDT)
- ZIP code: 59417
- Area code: 406
- FIPS code: 30-10375
- GNIS feature ID: 2831321
- Website: www.BrowningMontana.com

Browning is a former town and current census-designated place (CDP) in Glacier County, Montana, United States. It is the headquarters for the Blackfeet Indian Reservation and was the only incorporated town on the Reservation. The population was 1,018 at the 2020 census.

The town was named in 1885 for Commissioner of Indian Affairs Daniel M. Browning. The post office was established in 1895. The town was disincorporated on September 26, 2018, after the town's government collapsed financially.

== Geography ==
According to the United States Census Bureau, the town has a total area of 0.27 square miles (0.70 km^{2}), all land.

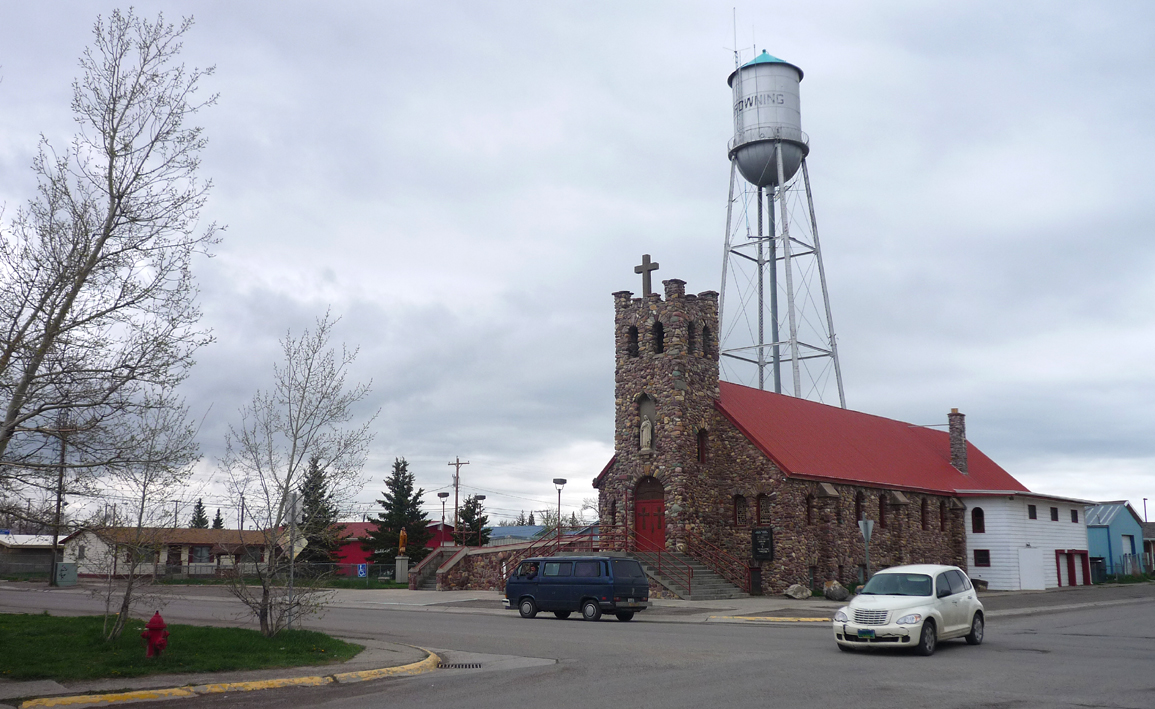
A church in Browning

=== Climate ===
Browning has a warm-summer humid continental climate (Dfb), bordering on a subarctic climate, as well as cold semi-arid. From January 23 to January 24, 1916, the temperature fell 100 °F (56 °C), from 44 °F (7 °C) to −56 °F (−49 °C), the world record for greatest temperature drop in 24 hours. Browning's climate is semi-arid and continental. Temperatures above 90 °F (32 °C) occur an average of twice annually, temperatures below 32 °F (0 °C) occur an average of 196 days annually, and those below 0 °F (−18 °C) occur an average of 32 days annually. There is a large degree of diurnal temperature variation that occurs in the summer, but not as much in the winter. Large temperature swings are possible, especially in fall, winter, and spring. Arctic-air intrusions from western Canada can bring sudden, severe temperature drops, while chinook events, with Pacific-originating warmer air descending from mountain ranges to the west, can result in dramatic temperature rises. Precipitation averages just over 14 inches per year, rendering the climate semi-arid. From November to March or April, the precipitation is primarily snow. Average monthly precipitation is lowest in winter and highest in the warm season. On average, June is the wettest month, with showers and thunderstorms most likely among all months.

Climate data for Browning (1894-1989)
Month	Jan	Feb	Mar	Apr	May	Jun	Jul	Aug	Sep	Oct	Nov	Dec	Year
Record high °F (°C)	66 (19)	68 (20)	72 (22)	91 (33)	93 (34)	100 (38)	99 (37)	102 (39)	94 (34)	83 (28)	72 (22)	69 (21)	102 (39)
Mean daily maximum °F (°C)	28.2 (−2.1)	31.9 (−0.1)	38.0 (3.3)	50.5 (10.3)	60.7 (15.9)	68.1 (20.1)	77.8 (25.4)	76.0 (24.4)	65.4 (18.6)	55.2 (12.9)	40.2 (4.6)	32.2 (0.1)	52.0 (11.1)
Mean daily minimum °F (°C)	8.0 (−13.3)	11.2 (−11.6)	16.9 (−8.4)	27.3 (−2.6)	35.5 (1.9)	41.8 (5.4)	46.1 (7.8)	44.4 (6.9)	37.5 (3.1)	30.9 (−0.6)	19.9 (−6.7)	13.3 (−10.4)	27.7 (−2.4)
Record low °F (°C)	−56 (−49)	−46 (−43)	−38 (−39)	−14 (−26)	1 (−17)	21 (−6)	24 (−4)	19 (−7)	0 (−18)	−17 (−27)	−39 (−39)	−47 (−44)	−56 (−49)
Average precipitation inches (mm)	0.81 (21)	0.70 (18)	0.81 (21)	1.09 (28)	2.00 (51)	2.77 (70)	1.51 (38)	1.39 (35)	1.53 (39)	0.83 (21)	0.81 (21)	0.72 (18)	14.97 (381)
Average snowfall inches (cm)	9.5 (24)	8.3 (21)	8.9 (23)	6.6 (17)	2.3 (5.8)	0.4 (1.0)	0.1 (0.25)	0.1 (0.25)	2.6 (6.6)	4.2 (11)	7.4 (19)	9.1 (23)	59.5 (151.9)

== Demographics ==
Historical population
Census	Pop.	Note	%±
1920	986		—
1930	1,172		18.9%
1940	1,825		55.7%
1950	1,691		−7.3%
1960	2,011		18.9%
1970	1,700		−15.5%
1980	1,226		−27.9%
1990	1,170		−4.6%
2000	1,065		−9.0%
2010	1,016		−4.6%
2020	1,018		0.2%
U.S. Decennial Census

=== 2010 census ===
As of the census of 2010, there were 1,016 people, 360 households, and 243 families living in the town. The population density was 3,763.0 inhabitants per square mile (1,452.9/km^{2}). There were 394 housing units at an average density of 1,459.3 per square mile (563.4/km^{2}). The racial makeup of the town was 5.5% White, 92.7% Native American, and 1.8% from two or more races. Hispanic or Latino of any race were 3.7% of the population.

There were 360 households, of which 45.3% had children under the age of 18 living with them, 28.6% were married couples living together, 28.6% had a female householder with no husband present, 10.3% had a male householder with no wife present, and 32.5% were non-families. 27.2% of all households were made up of individuals, and 8% had someone living alone who was 65 years of age or older. The average household size was 2.82 and the average family size was 3.43.

The median age in the town was 29.8 years. 33.1% of residents were under the age of 18; 9.6% were between the ages of 18 and 24; 23.6% were from 25 to 44; 23% were from 45 to 64; and 10.7% were 65 years of age or older. The gender makeup of the town was 46.1% male and 53.9% female.

=== 2000 census ===
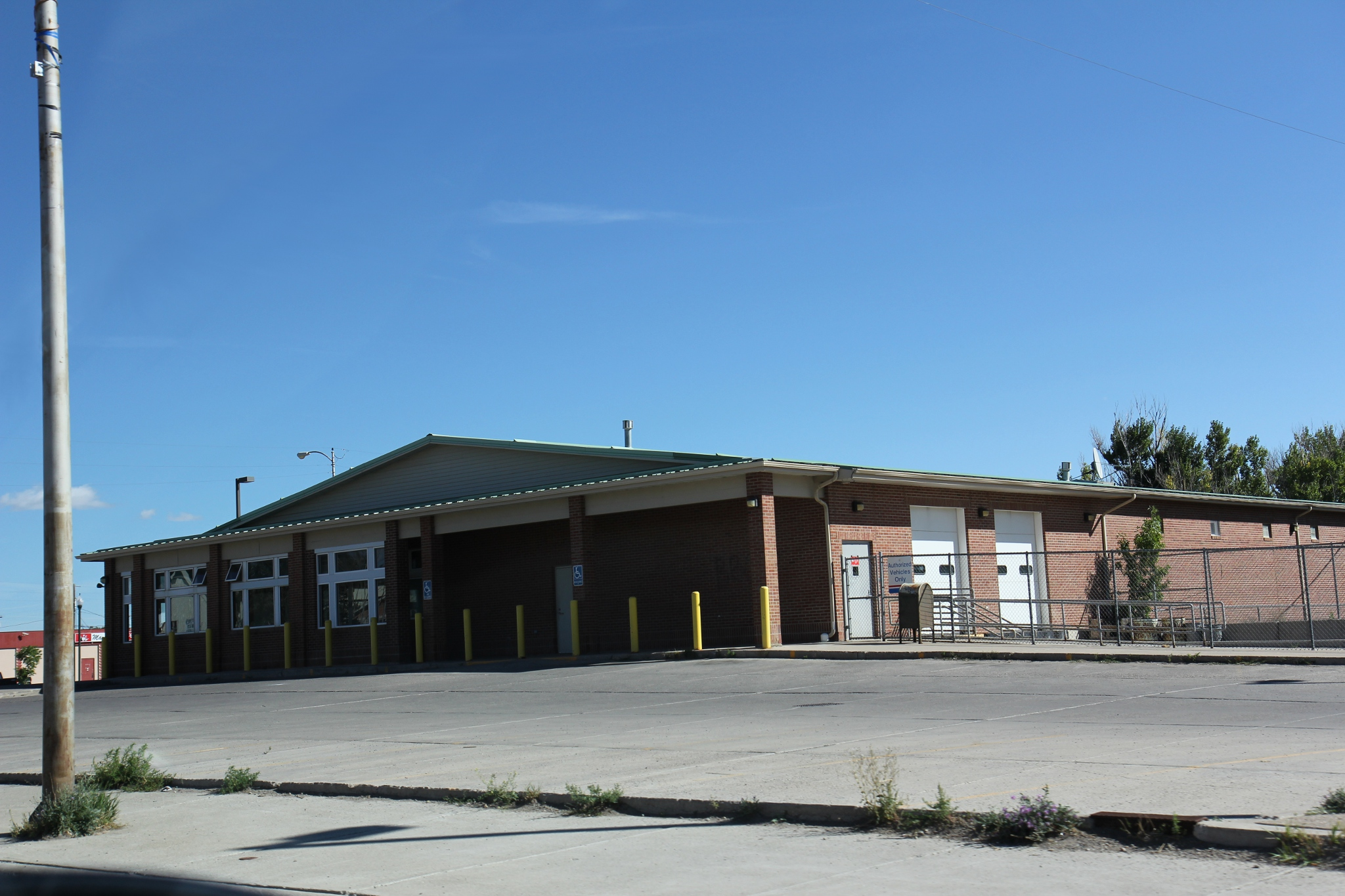
Post office

Languages (2000)	Percent
Spoke English at home	90.76%
Spoke Blackfoot at home	9.24%

As of the census of 2000, there were 1,065 people, 360 households, and 254 families living in the town. The population density was 3,911.2 inhabitants per square mile (1,510.1/km^{2}). There were 409 housing units at an average density of 1,502.0 per square mile (579.9/km^{2}). The racial makeup of the town was 6.57% White, 90.52% Native American, 0.09% from other races, African American, 0.09% and 2.72% from two or more races. Hispanic or Latino of any race were 1.88% of the population.

There were 360 households, out of which 39.2% had children under the age of 18 living with them, 36.7% were married couples living together, 25.3% had a female householder with no husband present, and 29.2% were non-families. 27.2% of all households were made up of individuals, and 8.9% had someone living alone who was 65 years of age or older. The average household size was 2.81 and the average family size was 3.40.

In the town, the population was spread out, with 31.5% under the age of 18, 10.3% from 18 to 24, 28.1% from 25 to 44, 18.1% from 45 to 64, and 12.0% who were 65 years of age or older. The median age was 31 years. For every 100 females, there were 83.0 males. For every 100 females age 18 and over, there were 77.2 males.

The median income for a household in the town was $23,879, and the median income for a family was $25,000. Males had a median income of $24,375 versus $20,972 for females. The per capita income for the town was $8,955. About 28.3% of families and 29.2% of the population were below the poverty line, including 33.4% of those under age 18 and 23.6% of those age 65 or over.

== Education ==
The area school district is Browning Public Schools, with its components being Browning Elementary School District and Browning High School District. The two districts, under the name "Browning Public Schools," educate students from kindergarten through 12th grade. They are known as the Indians. Browning High School is a Class A school.

Browning is home to Blackfeet Community College. In addition to the public school district operated in Browning and Heart Butte on the Blackfeet Reservation, there is also a language immersion program operated through Cutswood Academy and a small non-diocesan Catholic School run by the De La Salle Christian Brothers, De La Salle Blackfeet School.

== Media ==
Browning is home to low-power radio station KBWG-LP, broadcasting at 88.1FM.

The Glacier Reporter is a newspaper serving Browning and all of Glacier County. It is offered both in print and online.

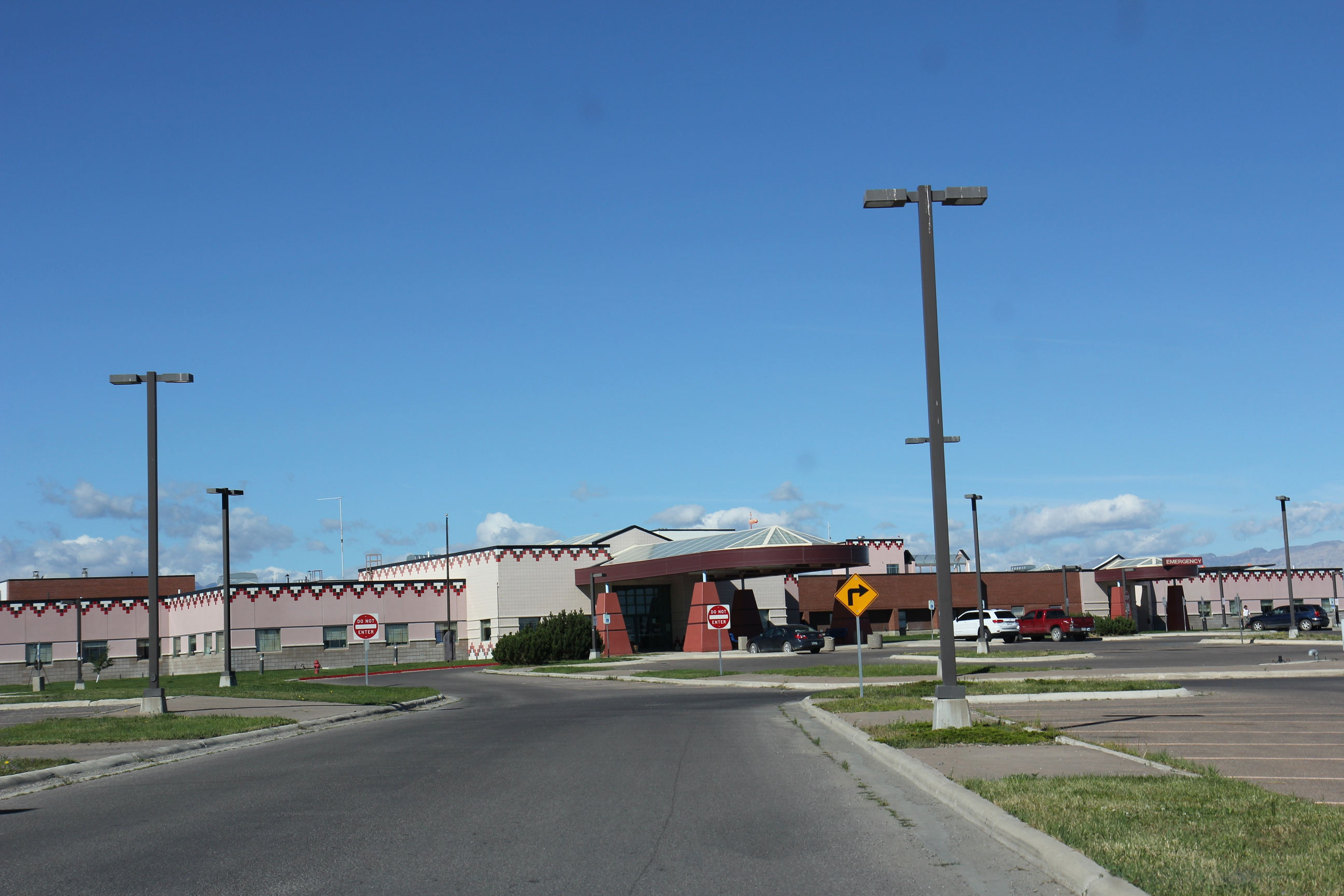
Blackfeet Community Hospital

== Infrastructure ==
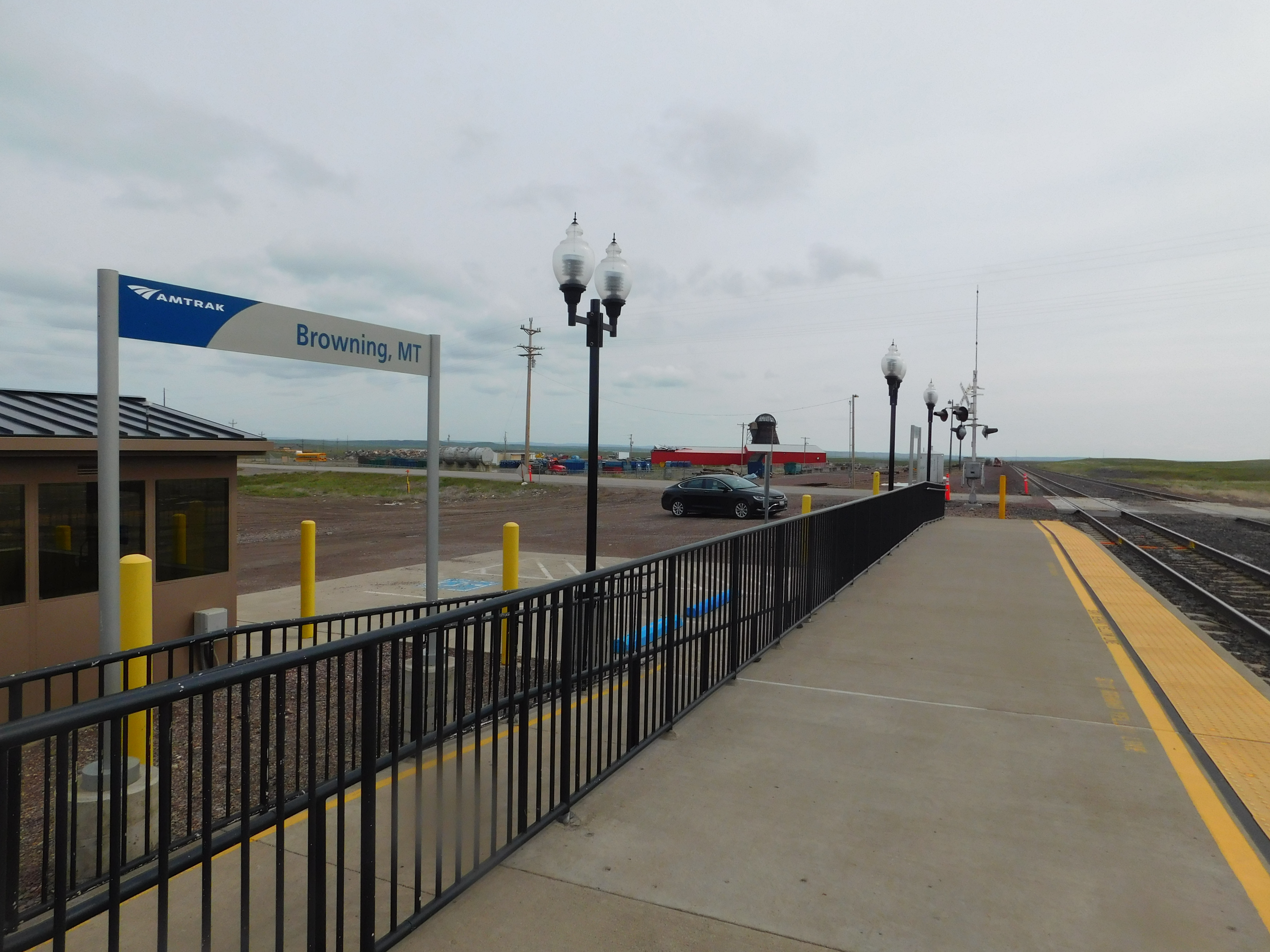
Amtrak station in Browning

=== Transportation ===
- US Route 2 comes into Browning from East Glacier from the west.
- US Route 89 comes into Browning from St. Mary from the north.
- The two US Routes meet on the western end of Browning and run through town together, splitting on the eastern end of town, with US 2 headed east towards Cut Bank and Shelby and US 89 headed south towards Choteau and Great Falls.
- US Route 87 ran through Browning until 1934, when US 89 replaced its original routing north of Great Falls. US 87 then ended in Great Falls until 1945, when it was changed to run from Great Falls to Havre.
- Amtrak's Chicago to Portland/Seattle Empire Builder serves Browning from October to April at a station just south of town. East Glacier receives passengers just a few miles west, from April to October.

=== Social ===
- Arrowhead Stadium, an outdoor high school football stadium.

== Notable people ==
- Shannon Augare, politician
- William Big Springs, artist
- Michele Binkley, politician
- Frosty Boss Ribs, politician
- Jackie Larson Bread, beadwork artist
- Gladys Cardiff, Native American poet and academic
- Elouise Pepion Cobell, MacArthur Grant winner and lead plaintiff in Cobell v. Salazar
- Lila Walter Evans, politician
- Lily Gladstone, actress
- Bonnie HeavyRunner, academic
- Joe Hipp, professional boxer
- Carol Juneau, politician and educator
- Denise Juneau, politician
- Darrell Kipp, educator, documentary filmmaker, and historian
- Terran Last Gun, artist
- Stuart Long, popular Roman Catholic priest stationed in Browning for three years
- Zahn McClarnon, actor
- Earl Old Person, honorary lifetime chief of the Blackfeet Nation
- Albert Racine, artist
- Steve Reevis, actor
- Hart Merriam Schultz, artist
- Robert Scriver, sculptor and museum owner
- Marvin Weatherwax Jr., politician
- James Welch, poet and author
- Tyson Running Wolf, member of the Montana House of Representatives
- Alfred Young Man, artist, writer, and educator
