= Marvin Weatherwax Jr. =

American politician

Member of the Montana House of Representatives from the 15th district
- Incumbent
- Assumed office January 7, 2019
- Preceded by: George Kipp III

Personal details
- Party: Democratic
- Education: Blackfeet Community College

Marvin R. Weatherwax Jr. is an American politician. He is a Democrat representing District 15 in the Montana House of Representatives.

== Personal life ==
Weatherwax holds an associate's degree in computer science from Blackfeet Community College. He lives in Browning, Montana. He is a member of the Blackfeet Nation.

== Political career ==
In 2018, former District 15 Representative George Kipp III did not run for re-election. Weatherwax ran for the seat and was unopposed in both the Democratic primary and the general election. He successfully ran for re-election in 2020.

As of June 2020, Weatherwax sits on the following committees:

- Fish, Wildlife, and Parks
- Natural Resources
- State Administration
