= The Payne Family Native American Center =

Coordinates: 46°51′35″N 113°59′11″W

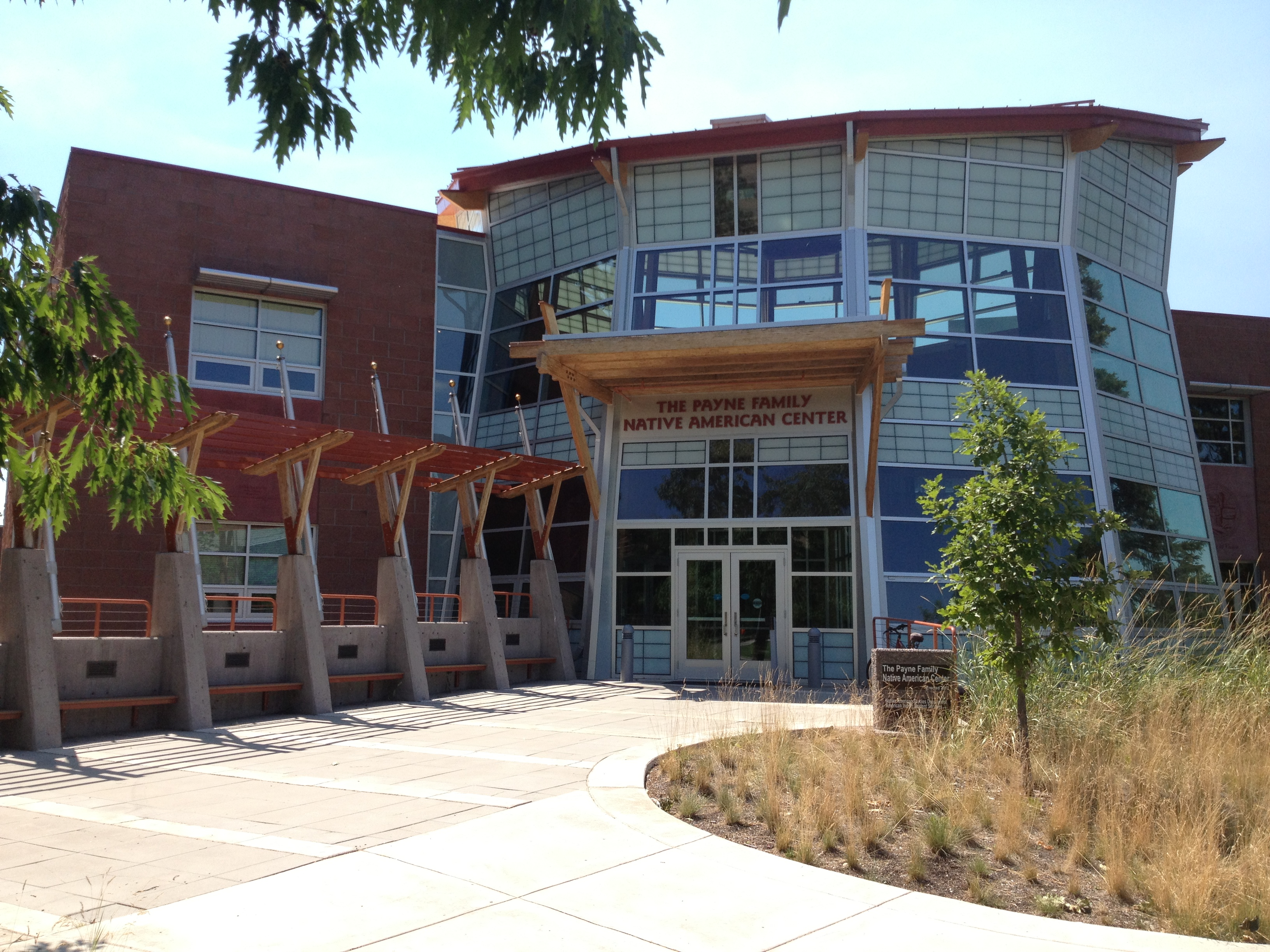
Payne Family Native American Center

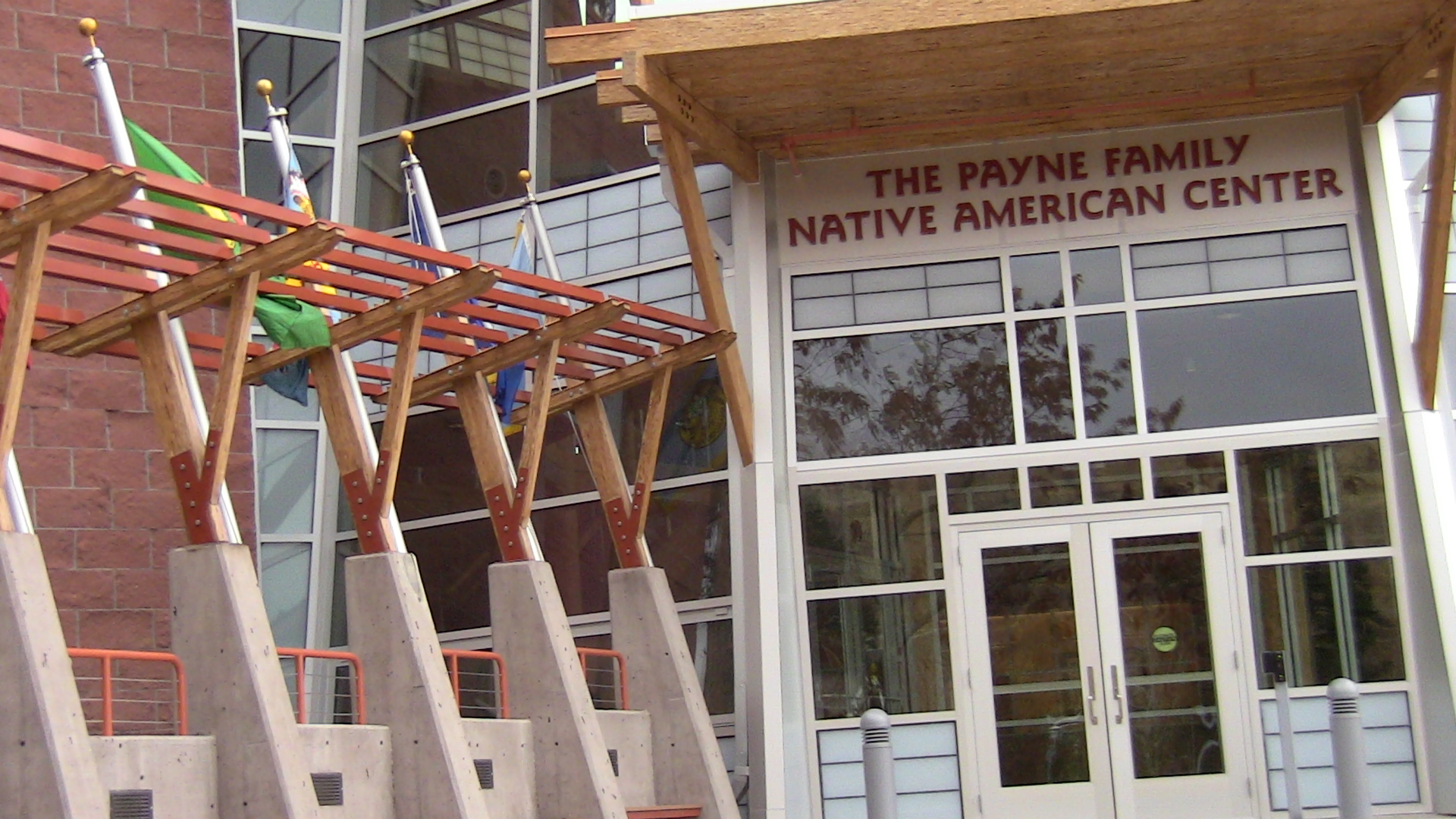
Entrance to the Payne Family Native American Center

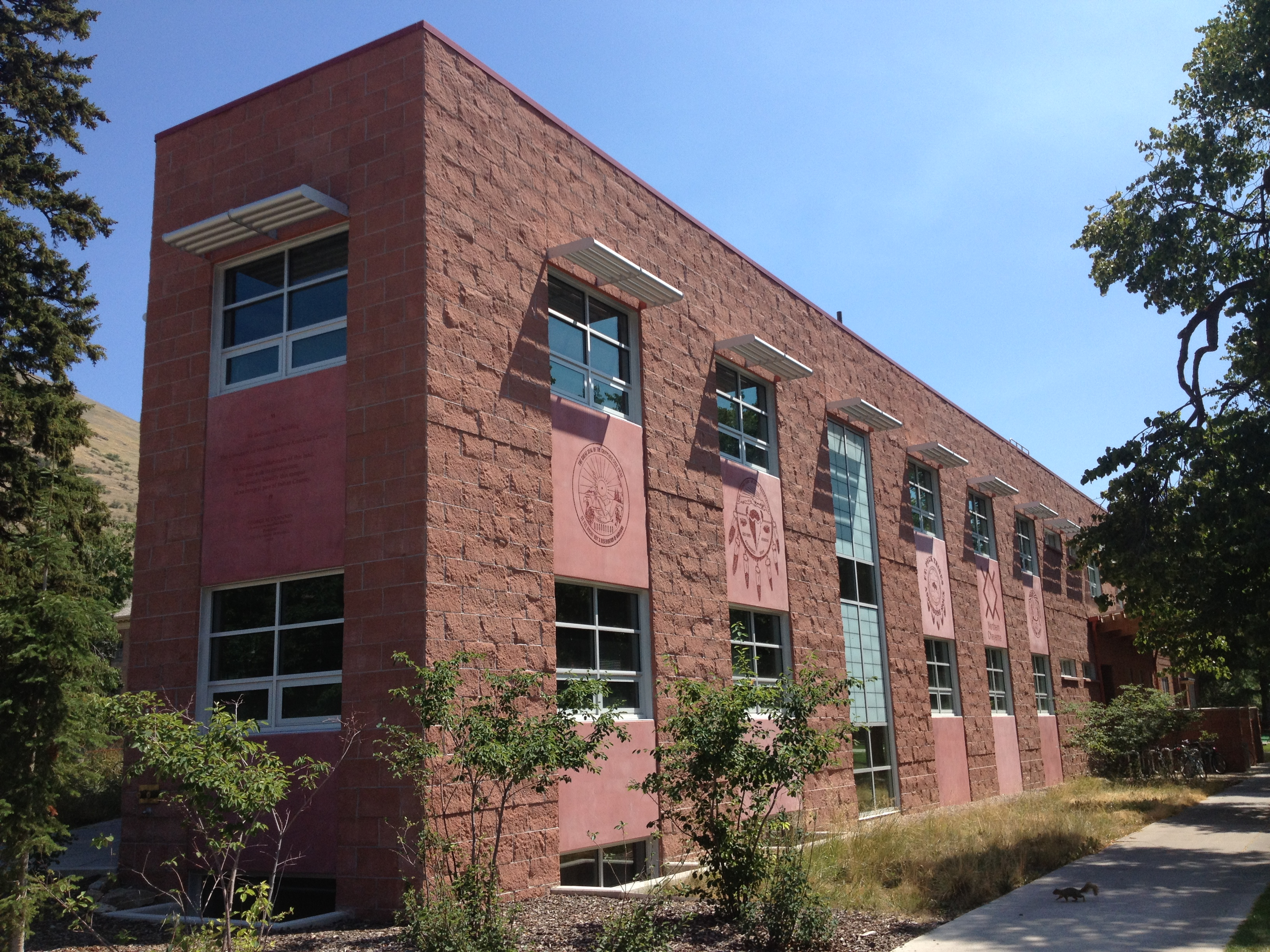
Wing of the Payne Family Native American Center

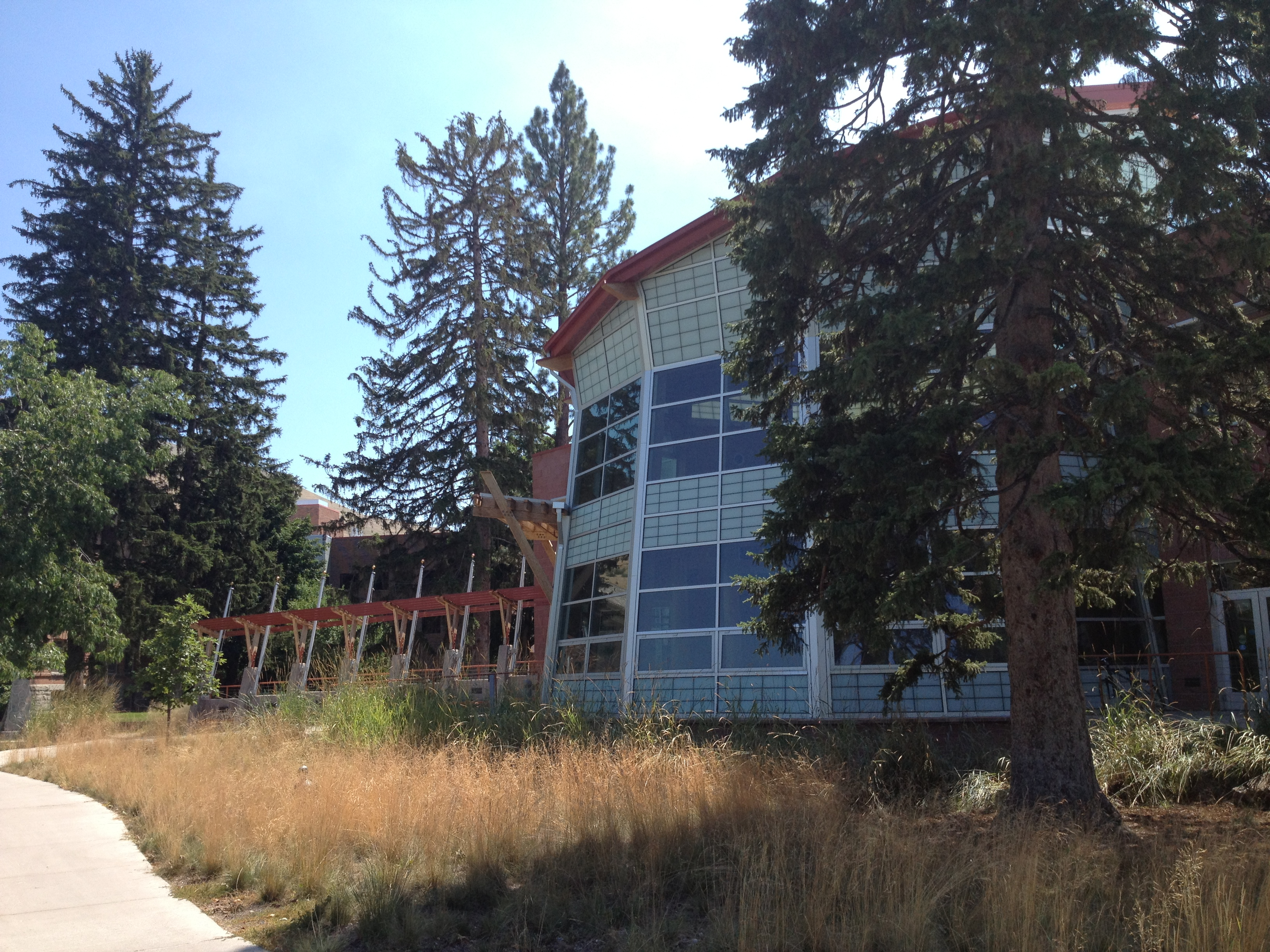
Back of the Payne Family Native American Center

The Payne Family Native American Center, located at the University of Montana in Missoula, Montana, is the first facility built exclusively for a department of Native American Studies and American Indian Student Services in the United States.

== Dedication ==
A dedication was held May 13, 2010, to celebrate the facility's new home at the University of Montana in Missoula, Montana. Joseph Medicine Crow wore his Presidential Medal of Freedom as he tapped the building with a coup stick; a common practice that warriors used when a new lodge or teepee was raised. The building's dedication represented a "coming home" for Montana Natives because the land the university occupies used to be home to Chief Charlo and the Bitterroot Salish prior to the federal government forcing them to migrate north to the Flathead Indian Reservation in 1891. The "Coming Home' walk began at the Adams Center and ended at the university's oval. Other key events included the dedication to the center's Bonnie HeavyRunner Memorial Gathering Space and a luncheon sponsored by the University of Montana and Crow Nation.

== Architecture and design ==
The building's structure is based around a 12-sided rotunda style design, with each side representing one of the 12 tribes in Montana. The 30,000-square-foot (2,800 m^{2}) building has Parfleche patterns that represent the 12 tribes etched and stained onto the floor. The logs that hold the building erect were salvaged from the nearby Clark Fork river. The Payne Family Native American Center is the most recent facility to be built at the university and occupies the last of its usable building space around the oval. The center was designed by Daniel Glenn, a member of the Crow Tribe and principal of Glenn & Glenn Architects Engineers, PLLC. The center holds four classrooms, one conference room, 12 office spaces, a student lounge and student meeting rooms. Keeping with Native American tradition, the center's main entrance faces east. The roof features a long skylight, which resembles the slit of a teepee's smoke hole. Carved into exterior walls are the seals of Montana's seven reservations and the landless Little Shell Tribe of Chippewa Indians of Montana, as well as quotes from former University President George Dennison and Native American elders such as Earl Barlow and Joseph Medicine Crow. Seven native plant and herb gardens circle the center and symbolize the state's reservations and the seven stars of the Big Dipper.

== Sustainability ==
According to project superintendent Todd Stenerson, 85 percent of the construction waste was diverted from the landfill. University project manager Jameel Chaudhry said rocks were dug up from the building site and used for retaining walls in place of concrete. Contractors were encouraged to purchase materials locally to reduce the carbon footprint. Bathrooms in the center include showers that could encourage biking and walking to campus. The center is the first building in the Montana University System to be certified by the Leadership in Energy and Environmental Design (LEED) Green Building Rating System.

== Financing ==
The Native American Center was financed largely by Terry Payne who graduated from the University of Montana in 1963. He is the chairman of the Payne Financial Group, in Missoula, Montana. The center cost $8.6 million to build. Other key donors include First Interstate Bank and the Indian Land Tenure Foundation.

== Awards ==
On November 5, 2010, The Payne Family Native American Center was awarded the Environmental Achievement award by the Pacific Northwest International Section of the Air and Waste Management Association during the association's 50th annual conference.

== Vandalism ==
On April 13, 2010, a rock was thrown into the window of a door on the northeast side of the building. The rock broke the outside glass pane, but did not go all the way through the window. The incident was reported to campus police around 10:58 a.m. the next day. President George Dennison sent out a campus wide email that appealed to the campus to report "any activities that appear to threaten the grounds, facilities, and campus members."
