= Chris La Tray =

Author from Little Shell Tribe of Chippewa Indians

- Born: 1967 (age 58–59)
- Occupation: Writer
- Website: chrislatray.com

Chris La Tray (born April 4, 1967) is a writer who lives in Missoula, Montana. He is a member of the Little Shell Tribe of Chippewa Indians of Montana and also identifies as Métis. His first full-length book, One-Sentence Journal: Short Poems and Essays From the World At Large won the 2018 Montana Book Award and a 2019 High Plains Book Award. He published Descended From a Travel-worn Satchel, a book of haiku and haibun poetry, in 2021. His next book, Becoming Little Shell was published on August 20, 2024, by Milkweed Editions. It won a 2025 Pacific Northwest Book Award. La Tray was named Montana’s poet laureate for 2023-2024.

La Tray grew up in Frenchtown, Montana. His grandparents identified as Chippewa but his father denied the family's Native American ancestry. He was raised with a knowledge of his Chippewa background, but first became aware that his heritage was also Métis and Little Shell in his early 40s, a common experience for people of Little Shell heritage. His Métis great-great-grandfather worked an interpreter for the US Army, as he knew multiple languages, including French, English, Cree, Chippewa (Ojibwe), Dakota, and Crow (Apsalooke).

La Tray keeps a bi-weekly Substack newsletter called, "An Irritable Métis".

Prior to publishing full-length books, La Tray published numerous freelance nonfiction and short fiction pieces as well as photography, and was a regular contributing writer for the Missoula Independent.
