= George Kipp III =

American politician

Member of the Montana House of Representatives from the 15th district
- In office January 5, 2015 – January 7, 2019
- Preceded by: Frosty Boss Ribs
- Succeeded by: Marvin Weatherwax

Personal details
- Born: 1951 (age 74–75)
- Party: Democratic
- Spouse: Melinda Bullshoe
- Occupation: Tribal executive, rancher

George Gerald Kipp III (born 1951) is an American politician. He served as a Democratic member of the Montana House of Representatives for District 15 from 2015 to 2019.

A Native American and member of the Blackfeet Nation, Kipp lived on the Flathead Indian Reservation in his younger years. He previously worked for the Blackfeet Nation as an executive and director of tribal programs, as well as for Blackfeet Community College as a vocational director. Kipp resides in the Blackfeet Nation at Heart Butte, Montana.
