= Kade Ferris =

Native American anthropologist (1969–2023)

- Giniw Wiidokaage
- Born: January 25, 1969; San Antonio, Texas, US
- Died: November 4, 2023 (aged 54)
- Citizenship: Turtle Mountain Band of Chippewa Indians of North Dakota and American
- Occupations: Tribal historic preservation officer, archaeologist
- Spouse: Kristin Lamphere
- Children: 7

Academic background
- Education: BS: University of North Dakota (1995), MS: North Dakota State University (2007)
- Thesis: The Chippewa of North Dakota: An examination of American Indian Cultural Evolution during the Eighteenth and Nineteenth Centuries (2006)

Academic work
- Discipline: Anthropology, History, Archaeology, Native American studies

Kade Michael Ferris (January 25, 1969 – November 4, 2023), also known as Giniw Wiidokaage, was a Native American anthropologist, Indigenous historian, and blogger based in Minnesota. Ferris was known for being one of the first Indigenous archaeologists as well as a Tribal Historic Preservation Officer in the United States.

A citizen of the Turtle Mountain Band of Chippewa Indians of North Dakota and a historian of the Ojibwe and Métis, he worked for the Red Lake Band of Chippewa Indians as an archaeologist. He served as the Tribal Historic Preservation Officer for the Red Lake Chippewa and the Turtle Mountain Chippewa. He was known for his accurate colorizations of historical Native American photographs and for using geographical technologies to decolonize maps and tell Indigenous histories.

He was the author of several books on the Ojibwe, Cree, and Métis people. His book, Charles Albert Bender: National Hall of Fame Pitcher (2020), a biography of Chief Bender written for middle school readers, was highly recommended by Native American children's literature specialist Jean Mendoza as one of the best books in 2020. That book and his use of oral traditions are included in state-mandated educational standards in North Dakota and Minnesota as reliable sources for teachers.

== Early life and education ==
Kade Michael Ferris was born on January 25, 1969, in San Antonio, Texas. His parents were Kristeen Evenmo Ferris and Albert Lee Ferris. His father was an artist and medical illustrator, originally from the Turtle Mountain Indian Reservation; his mother was also an artist and photographer, originally from Minnesota. His family moved to Moorhead, Minnesota.

Ferris earned his bachelor's degree in anthropology from the University of North Dakota. He then earned a master of science degree in anthropology from North Dakota State University.

== Career ==
During his 30-year career, he worked on a variety of tribal programs. In 2010, Ferris was working as a historic preservation officer for the Turtle Mountain Band of Chippewa, when human remains belonging to at least five American Indians were discovered near Park River, North Dakota. He was widely cited commenting on the complexity of Métis identity in America.

=== Oral history ===
He spoke with Prairie Public Television as elder sharing teachings about the power that young Native people can gain by learning their traditional stories. These teachings are included as part of North Dakota's education standards on Native American curriculum in schools.

=== Archaeology and cartography ===
Ferris was known for being one of the first Indigenous archaeologists as well as a Tribal Historic Preservation Officer in the United States. As an archaeologist for Turtle Mountain Band of Chippewa, his work included mapping and protecting culturally important sites on the reservation. In 2019, he won the Esri tribal story map competition for his story map that provides an in-depth look at Indian Land Cessions in Minnesota. He said working for tribes provided satisfaction that he could not find in private industries, "I'm only happy when I'm doing tribal resource management. It's more fulfilling. You're helping get roads and houses built, creating grants and plans to benefit people, not just to satisfy a client and make a profit. I've been working for tribal governments my whole life." He also used GIS to map out trading posts and Native villages throughout the upper Midwest as part of his work, saying, "I'm trying to rebuild this historical landscape through research, talking to elders, telling stories, and tying them all together through mapping."

His research on that treaty and Red Lake maps were included in the TRUTH Project, which investigated the history of the University of Minnesota as a land-grant university, having benefited from confiscated Native treaty lands.

=== Cultural advocacy ===
Ferris was known for presenting about Ojibwe and Métis in hopes of clearing up misunderstandings. In a 2019 presentation at the North Dakota Heritage Center, Ferris used the colorized historic photos that he was known for to bring to life Turtle Mountain Band of Chippewa and the Métis. Ferris said, "People have a misconception about the Ojibwe people in North Dakota. They think that the Ojibwe people are some kind of an afterthought that came with the fur trade. But really they were here before the fur trade and the fur trade came because of the Ojibwe people".

As part of his work for Red Lake, he created educational materials as part of honoring the Treaty of Old Crossing, which is a tribal holiday that celebrates the only treaty the tribe has made in its history.

=== Environmental activism and food sovereignty ===
Using his previous experience with helping Turtle Mountain establish a buffalo herd, he was credited with helping the Red Lake Band of Chippewa Indians establish a bison farm in 2018 while working as their Tribal Historic Preservation Officer.

Ferris published several articles about Native foodways.

=== Photographic work and curation ===
In 2021, he advised the Clay County Historical Society in Moorhead, Minnesota on their programming on Indigenous people for their 150 years ago exhibition called Makoce kin ihdago manipi (Dakota language: They leave marks as they come through here). That work included providing the Metis translations of signage throughout the history center. Ferris featured colorizations of historic Native leaders as part of the Dibaajimowin showcase in the Makoce kin ihdago manipi exhibition (2022–2023). The manager of the historical society Gabby Clavo said his exhibition was important because "The colorization really shows off the importance of the dress and regalia the Native American people would wear. The black and white images don't give the same visual impact to the viewer." As part of the exhibition, he presented on his colorizations and explained his process for "humanizing historical American Indians, the idea of legitimacy (e.g. the use of studio-owned props in photos), and the method of choosing what colors are used in colorization, based on historical and cultural understanding of regalia".

=== Writing ===
He maintained the Dibaajimowin blog, which features unique stories and historical anecdotes about the Ojibwe and Métis. He also wrote blog posts for the Turtle Mountain of Chippewa Heritage Center.

He published several books on Ojibwe and Metis history, leaders, and traditional stories. His book, Charles Albert Bender: National Hall of Fame Pitcher (2020), a biography of Chief Bender written for middle school readers, was published as part of the Minnesota Native American Lives Series, and was highly recommended by American Indians in Children's Literature as one of the best books in 2020. The book was included in a guide of reliable Native educational resources for Understand Native Minnesota, an initiative funded by the Shakopee Mdewakanton Sioux Community that provides lists of materials that meet Minnesota's academic standards in English language arts. The book was reviewed in The Circle: Native American News and Arts.

== Reviews ==
In a review for American Indians in Children's Literature, Jean Mendoza commended Ferris's description of major league baseball in the early 20th century and his discussion of the "micro-aggressions and even blatant aggression" he endured as a non-white athlete, but added that the book left the reader wondering about his life outside career in sports.

== Personal life and death ==
He died of cancer on November 4, 2023.

== Bibliography ==
=== Books ===
- Bush Dances & Buffalo Hunts: Short Essays on the History of the Ojibwe and Métis (2018)
- Charles Albert Bender: National Hall of Fame Pitcher (Wise Ink Creative Publishing, 2020)
- Dibaajimowin Tales (2018)
- Tawn Kaayaah: The Old Times (2019)
- Turtle Mountain Chiefs and Headmen (2019)

=== Articles and essay ===
- "Michif Foodways: A Remembrance by Elder Sandra Houle" Pawaatamihk: Journal of Métis Thinkers, 1, no. 37 (2023): 37–40
- "Ojiwbe shamanism." In Shamanism: An Encyclopedia of World Beliefs, Practices, and Culture, Mariko Namba Walter and Eva Jane Neumann Fridman, eds. (Santa Barbara, CA: ABC-CLIO, 2004), 334–35.
- "Pemmican: The Indigenous 'Super Food'", Turtle Mountain Chippewa Heritage Center, December 1, 2019
- "A Smithsonian Report on the Metis", Turtle Mountain Chippewa Heritage Center, November 12, 2019
