= Mark Turcotte =

American poet

Mark Turcotte (born 1958) is a Native American poet, and the current state of Illinois Poet Laureate, named in 2025. He has published two books of poetry, Exploding Chippewas and Feathered Heart. Road Noise, a chapbook was translated into French by the author Dominique Falkner. Illustrations for "Feathered Heart" and the cover art for "Road Noise" were created by Kathleen Presnell. Turcotte is a member of the Turtle Mountain Band of Chippewa Indians. He was born in Lansing, Michigan to a Scots-Irish American mother and Native American father. He spent many of his early childhood years on the Turtle Mountain Chippewa Reservation in addition to stints with migrant camps in western United States before returning to Lansing with his mother and older sister following his father's departure from the family.

Turcotte is currently a visiting assistant professor of English at DePaul University in Chicago, IL.

== His works ==
- and Kathleen S. Presnell. Songs of Our Ancestors: Poems About Native Americans. Chicago: Children's Press, 1995. ISBN 0516051547 OCLC 31377158
- The Feathered Heart. East Lansing: Michigan State University Press, 1998. ISBN 0870134825 OCLC 39060711
- Road Noise: A Poem. Minneapolis, MN: Mesilla Press, 1998. OCLC 42248430
- Exploding Chippewas. Evanston, Ill: TriQuarterly Books, 2002. ISBN 0810151227 OCLC 48951093
