= William Big Springs =

American painter

- Born: January 3, 1919; East Glacier Park, Montana
- Died: February 11, 1991 (aged 72)
- Citizenship: Blackfeet Tribe, United States
- Occupations: rancher, painter

William Forrest Big Springs (January 3, 1919 – February 11, 1991) was a Blackfoot American rancher and painter born in East Glacier Park Village, Montana.

== Background ==
Big Springs attended Browning High School in Montana. He lived on the Blackfeet Indian Reservation and served for a time as Glacier County Commissioner. He also operated an 18,000-acre ranch near Glacier National Park with his son Bill.

== Art career ==
Big Springs' work in oil and pastel has been exhibited across the country, including at the Bismarck National Indian Art Show, the First Annual Invitational Exhibition of American Indian Paintings, and the Museum of the Plains Indian.
