= Barbara K. Charbonneau-Dahlen =

Pembina Chippewa advocate and nursing researcher

Barbara K. Charbonneau-Dahlen PhD, RN
- Woksape Yunayewichayapi Win
- Born: June 6, 1952; Olga, North Dakota, United States
- Died: May 7, 2021 (aged 68)

Barbara K. Charbonneau-Dahlen PhD, RN (Ojibwe: Woksape Yunayewichayapi Win; June 6, 1952 – May 7, 2021) was an enrolled member of the Turtle Mountain Band of Chippewa Indians. She was a tenured professor of nursing who advocated for indigenous recruitment into the nursing field and fought for those who have experienced sexual abuse. She earned both a Bachelor's and master's degree from University of North Dakota (UND). She completed the Family Nurse Practitioner certification program at UND and earned a doctorate from Florida Atlantic University Christine E. Lynn College of Nursing. She was a professor at Minnesota State University Mankato in the School of Nursing until her death.

Charbonneau-Dahlen received ANA's 2002 Research Practice Award for her study, "Problems and Resources of American Indian Elders." She developed the Dream Catcher/Medicine Wheel Model which was implemented to recruit nurses through the Retention of American Indians into Nursing (RAIN) Program at the University of North Dakota. She filed a suit alleging abuse at St. Paul's Indian Mission School, in Marty, South Dakota.

== Published work ==
- Moss, Margaret P; Tibbetts, Lorayne; Henly, Susan J; Dahlen, Barbara J; Patchell, Beverly; Struthers, Roxanne (Summer 2005). "Strengthening American Indian nurse scientist training through tradition: partnering with elders". Journal of Cultural Diversity. 12 (2): 50–55. PMID 16028449. ProQuest 219364457.
- Henly, Susan J.; Struthers, Roxanne; Dahlen, Barbara K.; Ide, Bette; Patchell, Beverly; Holtzclaw, Barbara J. (April 2006). "Research Careers for American Indian/Alaska Native Nurses: Pathway to Elimination of Health Disparities". American Journal of Public Health. 96 (4): 606–611. doi:10.2105/AJPH.2004.054239. PMC 1470529. PMID 16507731.
- Charbonneau-Dahlen, Barbara K (2015). "Hope: The Dream Catcher-Medicine Wheel Retention Model for Diverse Nursing Students". Journal of Theory Construction & Testing. 19 (2): 47–54. ProQuest 1801608660.
- Charbonneau-Dahlen BK. Quilting a Field Pattern Portrait Using Butcher’s Methodology. Journal of Holistic Nursing. 2016;34(3):253-258. doi:10.1177/0898010115609249
- Charbonneau-Dahlen, Barbara K.; Lowe, John; Morris, Staci Leon (2 July 2016). "Giving Voice to Historical Trauma Through Storytelling: The Impact of Boarding School Experience on American Indians". Journal of Aggression, Maltreatment & Trauma. 25 (6): 598–617. doi:10.1080/10926771.2016.1157843. S2CID 146548071.
- Charbonneau-Dahlen, Barbara K. (January 2018). "A traditional American Indian death ritual: Developing nursing knowledge through aesthetic exposure". Nurse Education in Practice. 28: 92–95. doi:10.1016/j.nepr.2017.10.003. PMID 29055235.
- Charbonneau-Dahlen, Barbara PhD. Symbiotic Allegory as Innovative Indigenous Research Methodology. Advances in Nursing Science 43(1):p E25-E35, January/March 2020. DOI: 10.1097/ANS.0000000000000257
- Baldwin, J. A., Lowe, J., Brooks, J., Charbonneau-Dahlen, B. K., Lawrence, G., Johnson-Jennings, M., Padgett, G., Kelley, M., & Camplain, C. (2021). Formative Research and Cultural Tailoring of a Substance Abuse Prevention Program for American Indian Youth: Findings From the Intertribal Talking Circle Intervention. Health Promotion Practice, 22(6), 778-785. doi: 10.1177/1524839920918551
