= Pembina Band of Chippewa Indians =

Historical Ojibwe band

The Pembina Band of Chippewa Indians (Ojibwe: Aniibiminani-ziibiwininiwag) is a historical band of Chippewa (Ojibwe), originally living along the Red River of the North and its tributaries. Through the treaty process with the United States, the Pembina Band was settled on reservations in Minnesota and North Dakota. Some tribal members refusing settlement in North Dakota relocated northward and westward, some eventually settling in Montana. The traditional tribal leadership of Little Shell of The Pembina Band departed from The Turtle Mountain Band of Chippewa Indians and briefly camped in Dunsieth, ND where the Little Shell Campsite is memorialized, before residing at Spirit Lake, North Dakota, and Wolf Point, Montana.

The successors apparent of the Pembina Band are:

- Chippewa Cree Tribe of the Rocky Boys Indian Reservation (Montana) (in part);
- Little Shell Tribe of Chippewa Indians of Montana (in full);
- Red Lake Band of Chippewa (Minnesota) (in part);
- Roseau River Anishinabe First Nation (Manitoba) (in full);
- Turtle Mountain Band of Chippewa Indians (North Dakota) (in full); and
- White Earth Band of Ojibwe (Minnesota) (in part).
- Red Bear Band of Chippewa (Minnesota) (in part).
- Pembina Chippewa Tribe (North Dakota) (in part).
