= Alfred Young Man =

American Cree artist (born 1948)

- Kiyugimah, Eagle Chief
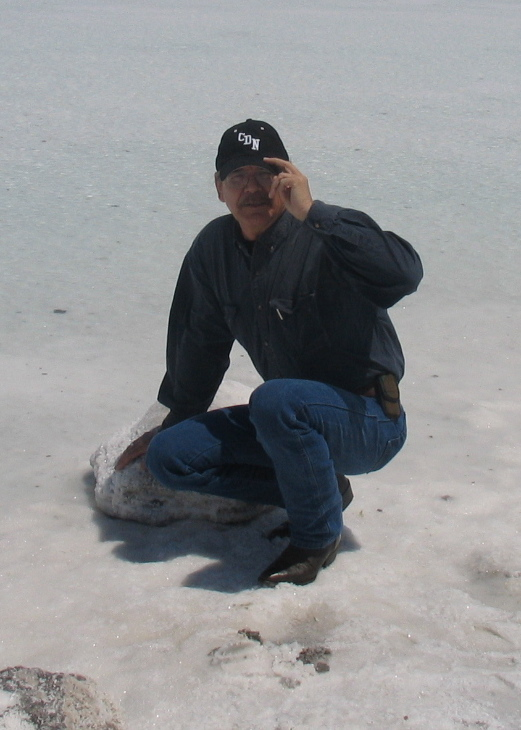
- Young Man, at Bonneville Salt Flats
- Born: 1948 (age 77–78); Blackfeet Indian Reservation, Browning, Montana
- Citizenship: United States/Canada
- Education: Cut Bank Boarding School, Institute of American Indian Arts, Slade School of Fine Arts
- Alma mater: M.A., American Indian Art, University of Montana, 1974; Ph.D., Anthropology, Rutgers University, 1997
- Occupations: Artist, writer, and educator.
- Years active: 45+
- Employer(s): Professor of Indigenous Arts, Professor Emeritus, Mount Royal University; University of Calgary
- Known for: painting, writing, music
- Style: visual languaging, non-fiction, rock/country/folk/American Indian
- Movement: Indian Fine Art political movement 1960's, Institute of American Indian Arts, Santa Fe, New Mexico
- Board member of: Former Board Chair, Society of Canadian Artists of Native Ancestry
- Parent(s): Joseph Young Man White Horse (Saustiquanis), Lillian Katherine Boushie

Alfred Young Man, Ph.D. or Kiyugimah (Eagle Chief) (born 1948) is a Cree artist, writer, educator, and an enrolled member of the Chippewa-Cree tribe located on the Rocky Boy Indian Reservation, Montana, US. His Montana birth certificate lists him as being 13/16th Cree by blood-quantum, his full sister, Shirley, is listed as 16/16ths. He is a former Department Head (2007–2010) of Indian Fine Arts at the First Nations University of Canada in Regina, Saskatchewan and former Chair (1999–2007) of Native American Studies, University of Lethbridge, Lethbridge, Alberta, Canada. He is professor emeritus at the University of Lethbridge and University of Regina.

== Background ==
Born in 1948 on the Blackfeet Indian Reservation in Browning, Montana, Young Man is the ninth child of fifteen brothers and sisters. His father Joseph Young Man White Horse (Sau-sti-qua-ńis) and mother Lillian Katherine Boushie were both Cree and fluent in Cree and English.

Young Man's paternal Cree grandmother Theresa Ground Woman Big Springs spoke Cree only and was married to Don't Talk Many White Horses, a Blackfeet Indian man. Since Don't Talk was deaf, he went by the nickname Deafy (pronoun: Deé-fee). Deafy was stricken with scarlet fever as a child in the late 19th century, as many Blackfeet children of his generation were, rendering him mute. Theresa and Deafy communicated their entire married lives using Indian sign-language. Theresa outlived Deafy to the approximate age of 113 years. Young Man's maternal grandfather Edward Boushie was Cree/Métis and Edward's wife Eliza was also Cree from the Erminskin Reserve in Hobbema, Alberta.

Young Man grew up in East Glacier Park, Montana and spoke Cree as a child. Like nearly all Indian children of his generation, when Alfred was six years old he and his siblings were taken away to Cut Bank Boarding School, a Bureau of Indian Affairs government school located a short distance north of Browning. Physical punishment was an everyday occurrence and Cree and Blackfeet traditions and customs were illegal to practise under US government law. Young Man stayed in government Indian boarding schools at various times and places until he was 20 years old when he went to the Slade School of Art in London, England, in 1968, which was the first time ever that he attended an all-white school for any length of time. His memory of the Cree language is sparse and he speaks and understands only a little.

== Academic career ==
Young Man attended the Institute of American Indian Arts in Santa Fe, New Mexico (1963–1968) where the German painter Fritz Scholder was his painting teacher for two years (1966–68). The IAIA Museum of Contemporary Native Arts retains a considerable number of Young Man's paintings in its collection from the five years he spent there. Young Man went on to study painting, film history and photography at the Slade School of Fine Arts, University College London in London, England, for four years (1968–72), where he met many famous and influential artists and musicians, amongst these were Pop artist's Richard Hamilton and David Hockney who were visiting artists and who stopped by his painting studio on random occasions. While at the Slade, Young Man was tutored and mentored for two years (1970–1972) by Bernard Cohen; another tutor was landscape painter William Townsend (1909–1973). The director of the Slade during Young Man's time at the school was Sir William Coldstream, founder of the Euston Road School. While in London, Young Man met Jimi Hendrix just a month before the famous rock musician died in September 1970, introduced to Hendrix by Steven Stills of CSN&Y, who was cutting what Stills described as his pink giraffe album in a sound studio in London.

Young Man earned his M.A. at the University of Montana (1972–74), where George Longfish (Seneca-Tuscarora) was his teacher and mentor in the Graduate Program in American Indian Art. He graduated with his doctor of philosophy degree (Ph.D.) in anthropology from Rutgers University in New Jersey in 1997, where he studied anthropology as a student of William Powers.

Young Man has been an art teacher since the early 1970s, beginning on his home reservation at the Rocky Boy Elementary School (1973–1974), after which he moved to the K.W. Bergan Elementary School in Browning, Montana, on the Blackfeet Indian reservation for a short time. He continued on to the Flathead Valley Community College in Kalispell, Montana (1975–1977), where he helped found the Total Community Education television training program. When that program came to a close, he moved on to the University of Lethbridge in 1977, where he eventually became chair of Native American studies (1999–2010). He taught in the Faculty Exchange Program at the University of Lethbridge/Leeds University Leeds, UK, in 1985 and the Faculty Exchange Program University of Lethbridge/Hokkai Gakuen University Sapporo, Hokkaido, Japan, in 1992. He remained tenured at the U of L up until 2007 when he chose early retirement and began work as department head of Indian Fine Art at the First Nations University of Canada in Regina, Saskatchewan. In addition to his teaching activities at the First Nations University, Young Man also worked as archival curator and custodian of the school's 1500 piece art collection. In August 2010 his employment at FNUC was terminated along with approximately 52 other professors and support staff, due to financial exigency budget cuts. He was appointed in 2015 Adjunct Professor to the Art Department, University of Calgary.

Most recently in terms of his lifetime, Young Man did an artist/writer's residency at the Lab 26 Tejiendo Identitdad Entre Las Culturas Originarias de America, Galeria de Arte Contemporaneo Paul Bardwell, Centro Colombo Americano de Medellin, Medellin, Colombia in 2011. He has spoken at numerous conferences and other venues held on every continent on the planet throughout his long professional career.

Young Man teaches his courses from the Native perspective. This was a new approach when he began teaching Indian fine art at the University of Lethbridge in 1977. Even today, it is done by very few if any Native art professionals.

== Community involvement ==
Young Man served as chair of the board of the Society of Canadian Artists of Native Ancestry, which was involved in convincing the National Gallery of Canada to include First Nations art and artists in its collection.

== Selected published works ==
- The Last Great Indian Art Movement of the 20th Century, being researched and to be published by J.Charlton Publishing Ltd. 3104 30th Ave., Suite 228, Vernon, BC V1T 9M9.
- The Buckskin Ceiling: A Native perspective on Native art politics. Aboriginal Issues Press, University of Manitoba. 2012. ISBN 9780986726132
- "Edward Poitras: Lost Homelands" in Lost Homelands (Co-eds.) Annette Hurtig and Trish Keegan. Kamloops: Kamloops Art Gallery & Confederation Art Gallery & Museum, January 2001 OCLC 948714116
- Indian Reality Today: Contemporary Indian Art of North America. Westphalian State Museum of Natural History: Muenster, Germany. 1999
- North American Indian Art: It's a Question of Integrity. Kamloops Art Gallery: Kamloops, British Columbia. 1998 (Second printing Fall 2002) ISBN 9781895497335
- "The Socialization and Art-Politics of Native Art". UMI Dissertation Services: Ann Arbour, Michigan. (Doctoral Thesis microfilm facsimile book)(604 pages) 1997
- Kiskayetum: Allen Sapp, a Retrospective. The Mackenzie Art Gallery and the University of Regina: Regina, Saskatchewan. (multi-lingual text in English, French and Cree) 1994 ISBN 9780920922958
- "The co-Existence of non-Contemporary Realities" Remote Control v.3, n.2, Definitely Superior Art Gallery: Thunder Bay, Ontario. (ed. and writer) 1993
- Indigena: Contemporary Native Perspectives. Co-authored with Gerald McMaster and Lee Ann Martin et al. Canadian Museum of Civilization: Ottawa, Ontario and Douglas & McIntyre: Vancouver/Toronto. 1992 ISBN 9789768097347
- "Banana Republic North" in Jeff Funnell: Notes From the Inquest. Introduction by Donald Goodes. Southern Alberta Art Gallery: Lethbridge, Alberta. 1992
- Visions of Power. Co-authored with Bryce Kanbara and Ingo Hessel. York Quay Gallery/Leo Kamen Gallery, Harbourfront: Toronto, Ontario. 1991 ISBN 9780969526803
- A Dominican Experience: Three Aboriginal Artists of Canada in the Dominican Republic. (ed.) Om niiak Native Arts Group: Ottawa, Ontario. 1989 OCLC 948715148
- Networking: National Native Indian Artists Symposium IV. (ed.) Graphcom Printers: Lethbridge, Alberta. Copyright Alfred Young Man. 1988 OCLC 231867842

=== Articles and essays ===
- "IAIA 1962-70: Where It All Began" Celebrating Differences, Fifty Years of Contemporary Native Arts at IAIA, 1962–2012, 50th Anniversary book, Institute of American Indian Art, Santa Fe, NM. Sunstone Press, October 10, 2012
- "A Critique of Anthropology from the Native Perspective", Native American Studies Across Time and Space: Essays on the Indigenous Americas, Oliver Scheiding (ed.), American Studies Monograph Series v. 191, Mainz, Germany: Universitatsverlag Heidelberg, Johannes Gutenberg University, Winter 2010.
- "Racism & the Politics of Indian Art Study" CAUT BULLETIN, Vol 57, No 6, Ottawa: Canadian Association of University Teachers, June 2010.
- "Edward Poitras: Showing Us The Way", Art Quantum, The Eiteljorg Fellowship for Native American Fine Art, Eiteljorg Museum of American Indians and Western Art, Indianapolis, Indiana, November 2009
- IndiVisible: African-Native American Lives in the Americas, Washington, D.C.: Museum of the American Indian, 2009
- "Segregation of Native art by ethnicity: is it self-imposed or superimposed?", (Re)Inventing the Wheel: Advancing the Dialogue on Contemporary American Indian Art, January 28, 2006. Denver: Denver Art Museum 2008. (includes cd-rom)
- Fritz Scholder: Indian Not Indian, Lowry Stokes Sims (eds) Prestel Publishing Munich Berlin London New York 2008 ISBN 9783791339696
- "Bob Boyer and SCANA" Bob Boyer: His Life's Work, Canadian Museum of Civilization/MacKenzie Art Gallery 2008 ISBN 9781896470689
- "Majesties Lost" in Eating Fire, Tasting Blood: Breaking the Silence of the American Indian Holocaust. An Anthology of essays by American Indian Writers, edited by Marijo Moore, New York: Thunders Mouth Press, Spring 2007. ISBN 9781560258384
- A Book Of..... Banff, AB: Aboriginal New Works Residency, Banff Centre, 2005
- "The Primitive White Mind" in Beyond the Reach of Time and Change: The Frank A. Rinehart Collection Revisited. Simon Ortiz (ed.). University of Arizona Press, 2004.
- "Lost Homelands" in Indian Stories, Indian Histories. Fedora Giordano and Enrico Coma (eds.) Torino: Otto Editore, 2004
- "Indians as Mascots: Perpetuating the Stereotype" in The Challenges of Native American Studies: Essays in Celebration of The Twenty-Fifth American Indian Workshop (Studia Anthropologica). Barbara Saunders and Lea Zuyderhoudt (eds.). Leuven University Press, Belgium 2004.
- "Landscaping the political environment" in Spirit Magazine, vol. 1, n. 2, Spring-Summer 2003.
- "Indians as Mascots: Perpetuating the Stereotype" in Genocide of the Mind An Anthology by Urban American Indians: One Spirit Living In Two Worlds. edited by Marijo Moore, (New York: Nation Books, in conjunction with AMERINDA, a nonprofit American Indian organization, Fall 2003).
- "Native American Art: Phonix aus der Asche?" for the Lebenszeichen 2001 Calendar, (Vienna: Gesellshaft fur bedrohte volker, 2001.) [Written for month of September, misspelled name as Alfred Longman.]
- "Full Circle". Last Word (editorial) written for aboriginal times: National Business and News Magazine, v. 5, Issue 8, June 2001.
- "Kohkominahkasas: Grandmother Spider" in Craft Factor Magazine, v.25:2, (Saskatoon, Saskatchewan Craft Council, March 2001.)
- "Teaching North American Indian Art in Native American Studies" in Indigenous Intellectual Sovereignties. University of California, Davis, 2001. (Publication date and publisher still to be determined.)
- "Edward Poitras: Lost Homelands". Lost Homelands. (Co-eds.) Annette Hurtig and Trish Keegan. (Kamloops, BC: Kamloops Art Gallery & Confederation Art Gallery & Museum, January 2001.)
- "Bradlee LaRocque: Electric Catalogue". Internet site. (Estevan, SK: Estevan National Exhibition Centre, Art Gallery and Museum), 2000. URL: http://www.cap.estevan.sk.ca/enec/stretched/youngman.html
- "Native American Indian Art: Theory and Permutations in Western Cognitive Thinking". Aboriginal Health, Identity and Resources. Edited by Jill Oakes, Skip Koolage, Leanne Simpson and Nancy Schuster. Department of Native Studies and Zoology, and Faculty of Graduate Studies, University of Manitoba, 2000.
- "Token and Taboo: Native Art in Academia". Wíčazo Ša Review v.14 n.2, University of Minnesota Press 1999
- "Larry Abbott interview with Alfred Young Man". Abbot, Larry. Co-authored by Alfred Young Man. The Canadian Journal of Native Studies v.16, n.2 Brandon University: Brandon, Manitoba. 1996 (pp. 315–362)
- "Indian Art Centre Retrospective". ACS Bulletin AEC. v.18, n.2-3, Association for Canadian Studies: Montreal, Quebec. Su-Fa 1996.
- "First Nations Art, 'Canada', and the CIA: A Short Non-fiction Story". Australian -Canadian Studies: Music/Image/Text: A Special Issue On Indigenous Media. v.14, n.1-2, University of Wollongong: New South Wales, Australia.1996 (pp. 179–206)
- "Native Arts in Canada: the State, Academia, and the Cultural Establishment". Beyond Quebec: Taking Stock of Canada. McGill-Queen's University Press: Montreal, Quebec. 1995 (pp. 218–248)
- "Silencing the Native Voice at the University of Lethbridge". The Meliorist. v.29, n.12, The University of Lethbridge: Lethbridge, Alberta. 1994
- "Institution/Revolution: Contemporary Native American art". The Lethbridge Herald. November 18, 1994
- "Savage Graces & Cultural Amnesty". Talking Stick Magazine. v.1, n.4, Circle Vision Arts Corporation: Regina, Saskatchewan. Indian Summer 1994
- "Savage Graces Raises Questions". The Lethbridge Herald. CoverSTORY/7. Lethbridge, Alberta. May 15, 1994
- "First Nations Art, 'Canada' and the CIA: A Short Non-fiction Story". Studies In Critical Practises. Canadian/Communications Research Group: University of Calgary, Calgary, Alberta. (The unabridged version of "An Historical Overview and Perception of Native Art, Culture, and the Role of the Native Curator: Non-fiction Story") 1994
- "To: John Bentley Mays From: Alfred Young Man". Talking Stick: First Nations Arts Magazine. v.1, n.2, Circle Vision Arts Corporation: Regina, Saskatchewan. 1994
- "Challenge to the Status Quo". Talking Stick: First Nations Arts Magazine. v.1, n. 2, Circle Vision Arts Corporation: Regina, Saskatchewan. Winter 1994.
- "Teaching North American Indian Art in Native American Studies". Gakuen Ronshu: The Journal of Hokkai-Gakuen University. n.73, Sapporo-shi, Hokkaido, Japan. September 1992 (pp. 71–82)
- "An Historical Overview and Perception of Native Art, Culture, and The Role of the Native Curator: Non-fiction Story". (abridged) New Territories 350/500 Years After. Pan-Canadian exhibition catalogue. Vision Planetaire: Montreal, Quebec. June 1992 (pp. 33–37)
- "The Metaphysics of North American Indian Art". Canadian Music: Issues of Hegemony and Identity. Diamond, Beverly and Robert Witmer (eds.). Canadian Scholars' Press Inc.: Toronto, Ontario. 1994
- "The Savage Civilian: The Work of Rebecca Belmore". (abridged) Between Views exhibition catalogue. Walter Phillips Gallery: Banff, Alberta. June–September 1991 (pp36–39)
- "Token and Taboo: Academia vs. Native Art". European Review of Native American Studies. v.5, n.2, Salztorgasse 7/21, A-1014 Wien, Austria: Christian F. Feest. 1991 (pp. 11–14).
- "On A Contemporary Ecological Anthropology". Commentary. Native Art Studies Association of Canada Newsletter. Summer 1990 v.4, n.2 (4 pages/insert+ pp. 15,16)
- "Issues and Trends in Contemporary Native Art". (abridged feature) Artscraft. A National Indian Arts and Crafts Publication, v.1, n.1 (NIAC): Ottawa. Winter 1989 (pp. 5–8)
- "Issues and Trends in Contemporary Native Art". Parallelogramme Magazine, v.13, n.3 Toronto. February/March 1988 (English: pp. 24–31; French: pp. 32–39)
- "Token and Taboo: Academia vs. Native Art". Fuse Magazine. v.11, n.6, Toronto. July 1988 (pp. 46–48)

== Sources ==
- Blomberg, Nancy J., ed. [Re]inventing the Wheel: Advancing the Dialogue on Contemporary American Indian Art. Denver: Denver Art Museum, 2008. ISBN 978-0-914738-59-6.
