= Hell Creek Recreation Area =

Park in Montana, USA

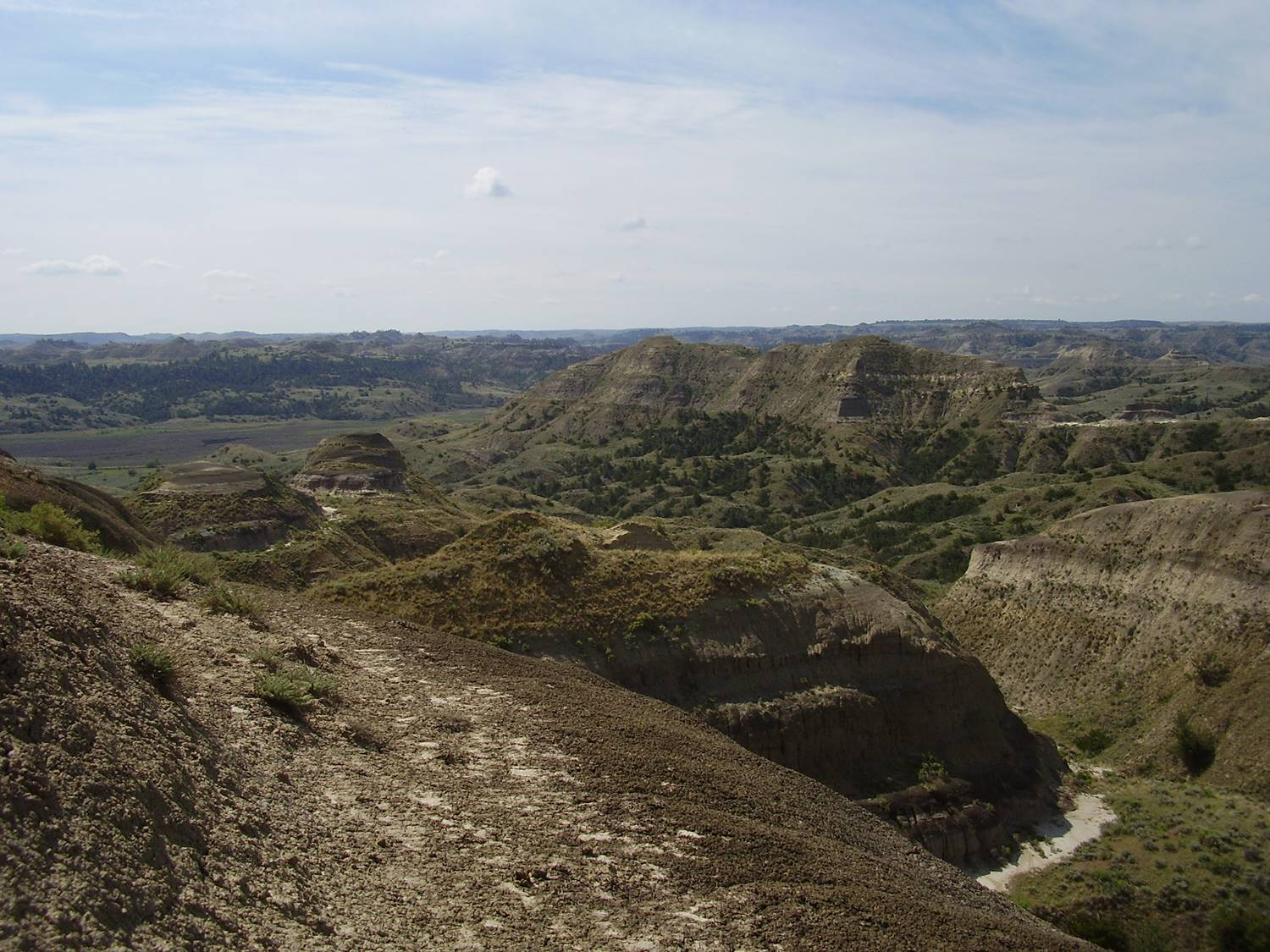

- Location within Montana
- Location: Garfield County, Montana, United States
- Nearest town: Jordan, Montana
- Coordinates: 47°37′00″N 106°53′32″W
- Area: 337 acres (136 ha)
- Elevation: 2,349 ft (716 m)
- Designation: Montana state park
- Established: 1966
- Administrator: Little Shell Tribe of Chippewa Indians of Montana
- Website: Hell Creek Recreation Area

Hell Creek Recreation Area is a public recreation area managed by the Little Shell Tribe of Chippewa Indians of Montana occupying 337 acres (136 ha) on the south side of Fort Peck Lake twenty miles (32 km) due north of the community of Jordan, Montana. The recreation area sits on the western side of Hell Creek Bay and includes a year-round marina and facilities for water sports, camping, and fishing for walleye, northern pike, and smallmouth bass. The park is managed under a no-cost lease arrangement with the U.S. Army Corps of Engineers. The park has Bortle scale class 1 skies (low light pollution).
