= Joe Read =

American politician

Member of the Montana House of Representatives from the 15th district
- In office January 3, 2011 – January 7, 2013
- Preceded by: Frosty Boss Ribs
- Succeeded by: Frosty Boss Ribs

Personal details
- Party: Republican

Joe Read is an American politician and former Republican member of the Montana House of Representatives. He represented House District 15 from 2011 to 2013, and was defeated by Frosty Boss Ribs, who he originally defeated himself in 2010, in the 2012 election. Read received attention in 2011 for introducing a bill that global warming is "beneficial to the welfare and business climate of Montana".

== Personal life ==
Read was born in Ronan, Montana in 1955.
