= Frosty Boss Ribs =

American politician

Forrestina Boss Ribs

Member of the Montana House of Representatives from the 15th district
- In office January 7, 2013 – January 5, 2015
- Preceded by: Joe Read
- Succeeded by: George Kipp III
- In office January 5, 2009 – January 3, 2011
- Preceded by: Joey Jayne
- Succeeded by: Joe Read

Personal details
- Born: 12 April 1955 (age 71) Browning, Montana, U.S.
- Party: Democratic
- Profession: Teacher

Forrestina Calf "Frosty" Boss Ribs (born April 12, 1955) is an American politician. She was a Democratic member of the Montana House of Representatives, representing the 15th District from 2009 to 2011, until her defeat by 72 votes in 2010 by Republican Joe Read, after which she again represented the district from 2013 to 2015 after defeating Joe Read, who again ran for reelection, by 523 votes.

Additionally, she served as vice-chair of the Blackfeet Tribal Business Council, the governing body of the Blackfeet Nation. She resides on reservation land in Heart Butte.

== See also ==
- List of Native American politicians
- Native American women in politics
