= Bonnie HeavyRunner =

American academic

Memorial for Bonnie HeavyRunner in The Payne Family Native American Center on the University of Montana Campus

Bonnie Combes HeavyRunner (died November 24, 1997) founded the Native American Studies program at the University of Montana. She was the director of the Native American Studies department and pioneered the creation of The Payne Family Native American Center on the University of Montana campus. She was a member of the Blackfeet Nation and worked to create a support system for Native American students on the University of Montana campus until her death of ovarian cancer on November 24, 1997.

== History ==
Bonnie "Sim-sin" HeavyRunner grew up on the Blackfeet Indian Reservation in Browning, Montana. She grew up with her parents, Gene and Gertie HeavyRunner, and 12 brothers and sisters. Both of her parents were taken from their tribes in Montana and educated in boarding schools in Kansas and Pennsylvania before returning to Montana. She received her law degree from the University of Montana before becoming the director of the Native American Studies department. She had ovarian cancer for over five years before she died in 1997, a year after Native American Studies became available as a major on the University of Montana campus.

== Accomplishments ==
HeavyRunner is perhaps best known for her work with the Native American Studies Program that she launched at the University of Montana. She sought scholarships and mentoring for the close to 300 Native American students on campus at the time. She also had the idea to give Native American students a place to call their own, which led to The Payne Family Native American Center. She was credited with educating people on the importance and necessity of such a facility. For this reason, the Native American Center's main lobby was dedicated in her memory as "The Bonnie "Sim-Sin" HeavyRunner Gathering Place."

She helped organize the first Kyi-Yo Academic Conferences on the University of Montana campus that bring together Native American scholars. The Kyi-Yo Native American Student Association also hosts an annual Kyi-Yo Pow Wow that includes a "Bonnie HeavyRunner Memorial Tipi Race" where students compete to erect a tipi the fastest in her honor.
