= Arrowhead Stadium (Montana) =

Football stadium in Browning, Montana

- Interactive map of Arrowhead Stadium
- Former names: N/A
- Address: 58 Border Rd, Browning, MT 59417; Browning, Montana; United States
- Location: Browning, Montana
- Coordinates: 48.551921311160704°N 113.03682618063972°W
- Seating type: Grandstands
- Capacity: 1,500
- Type: Outdoor high school football stadium
- Surface: Artificial turf
- Scoreboard: Yes
- Screen: N/A
- Field shape: Rectangle
- Current use: Browning Public Schools football and track teams

Construction
- Cost: $7.5 million
- Architect: LPW Architecture

Tenant
- Browning High School

Arrowhead Stadium is an outdoor high school football stadium in Browning, Montana. The stadium supports Browning's football and track teams, and is part of a larger Browning Public Schools Sportsplex.

== History ==
In 2019, Browning Public Schools approved a project to renovate both the school itself and the sports complexes. The project set the ground breaking for July 1, 2019 with LPW Architecture for the architecture and local contractors for the building. Afterwards, construction began on Arrowhead Stadium, Browning Public Schools Sportsplex and school buildings. The sports complex was completed in spring 2023.

== Structural details ==
The Browning Public Schools Sportsplex consists of Arrowhead Stadium, which contains grandstands, artificial turf field, and a rubber track, and other facilities including a turf soccer field, turf softball field, volleyball courts, and tennis courts.

== Events ==
Arrowhead Stadium and the Browning Public Schools Sportsplex supports the Browning High School and junior high football, track, softball, tennis, and volleyball teams games. Football games and track meets are held at Arrowhead Stadium, volleyball games are held inside the Browning Public Schools gymnasium, volleyball meets are held at the volleyball courts, and softball and soccer games are held at their respective fields.

== Gallery ==
Arrowhead Stadium in Browning, Montana looking towards the endzone with "Browning"

Arrowhead Stadium Browning, Montana and the nearby softball field (Browning Public Schools Sportsplex)

Browning Public Schools softball field (part of Browning Public Schools Sportsplex)
