= Little Shell Band of Chippewa Indians =

The Little Shell Band of Chippewa are a historic sub-band of the Pembina Band of Chippewa Indians led by Chief Little Shell in the nineteenth century. Based in North Dakota around the Pembina River, they are part of the Ojibwe, one of the Anishinaabe peoples, who occupied territory west of the Great Lakes by that time. Many had partial European ancestry from intermarriage by French-Canadian fur traders and trappers. Some began to identify as Métis, today recognized as one of the Indigenous Peoples of Canada. Located in the 17th century in the areas around the Great Lakes, they gradually moved west into North Dakota and Montana.

Recognized successor apparent bands include the federally recognized Turtle Mountain Band of Chippewa Indians, based in North Dakota, and the Little Shell Tribe of Chippewa Indians of Montana.

== History ==
The Ojibwe, also known as Chippewa, an Indigenous people of the Northeastern Woodlands, lived near the Great Lakes at the time of European and African contact. Some of them migrated from present-day Michigan, Wisconsin, and Minnesota into the northern Great Plains beginning in the 17th century. There they adopted the use of horses, and gradually modeled some of their culture on other Plains tribes.

European-American encroachment pushed these Ojibwe bands westward from Minnesota into present-day North Dakota. Many settled in the area around the Pembina River in northeastern North Dakota, where the Little Shell Band of Chippewa were living in the nineteenth century. Due to intermarriage with French-Canadian fur trappers over the years, this settlement became a center for the Métis people, who developed their own culture, related to, but separate from, the French and Ojibwe. They have been since recognized as an independent First Nation by Canada.

European-American settlement pressure continued and many descendants of the band continued to migrate west to Montana. Chippewa live on both sides of the Canadian-US border.

== Successors ==
=== Turtle Mountain Band of Chippewa Indians ===
The federally recognized Turtle Mountain Band of Chippewa Indians of North Dakota has a reservation in north-central North Dakota along the US-Canada border, in the Turtle Mountains where the Chippewa had long lived, along with off-Reservation trust parcels across western North Dakota, eastern Montana and northern South Dakota, making the Turtle Mountain Indian Reservation one of the most spread out in the United States.

=== Little Shell Tribe of Chippewa Indians of Montana ===
The Little Shell Tribe of Chippewa Indians of Montana is the only Chippewa band to be recognized by the state of Montana; they gained federal recognition in December 2019. The Montana Ojibwe have been well-established in that area for more than a century. Some of its members were associated with the North-West Rebellion, as described in Joseph Kinsey Howard's Strange Empire. During the mid 20th century they were widely identified as the "Landless Indians of Montana".

== Sovereign Citizen claims ==
The so-called "Little Shell Pembina Band of North America," based in North Dakota, is a sovereign citizens group founded by one family descended from the historical Little Shell Chippewa Band and made up mostly of white militia members. It claims to be a successor apparent of the Pembina Band of Chippewa Indians, but it is not recognized as a Native American tribe by the US federal government nor by North Dakota. It is classified as an extremist organization by the Anti-Defamation League.
