= Little Shell Tribe of Chippewa Indians of Montana =

Federally recognized tribe in Montana, US

Esensininiwag (Ojibwe)

Total population
- 7,300+ enrolled members

Languages
- Ojibwe, Michif, Cree, English

Related ethnic groups
- other Anishinaabeg (Ojibwe and Cree peoples), and Métis

Little Shell Tribe of Chippewa Indians of Montana (Ojibwe: Esensininiwag) is a federally recognized tribe of Ojibwe, Métis, and Cree people in Montana. The name of the tribe is often shortened to Little Shell. In 2023, the population of enrolled tribal members is approximately 6,900. The Tribe's headquarters is in Great Falls, in a 35,000-sq. foot office complex.

The Little Shell Tribe is named after its 19th-century leader, Esens, known as "Little Shell." The Tribe was also referred to as the Little Shell Band of "Landless" Chippewa Indians of Montana because it did not have an Indian reservation, resulting from conflicts with federal authorities dating back to the 19th century. Although considered "landless", the tribe gained state recognition from Montana in 2000. On December 20, 2019, the National Defense Authorization Act was signed into law, finally granting the Tribe federal recognition. The Tribe owns over 800 acres of land in and around Great Falls, Montana, and manages the Hell Creek Recreation Area.

Members elect a government consisting of a Chairman, First Vice-Chairman, Second Vice-Chairman, Secretary-Treasurer, and Tribal Council following their constitution. While headquartered in Great Falls, tribal members live throughout Montana, particularly in Havre, Lewistown, Helena, Butte, Chinook, Hays, Wolf Point, Hamilton, and Billings.

== History ==
In the early 18th century, the ancestors of the Little Shell migrated from the Great Lakes area, likely northern Ontario and northern Minnesota, into the Plains of Canada and the United States. They allied with the Assiniboine and Cree in a confederacy, driving out the Dakota and probably other tribes native to the areas now known as Alberta, Manitoba, and Ontario in Canada, and Minnesota and Montana in the United States.

The Little Shell are part of the historical Pembina Band of Chippewa Indians, first recorded by European settlers in documents of the Hudson's Bay Company at Fort Garry (Winnipeg) in the early 18th century. These logs and diaries show the Ojibwa people lived across approximately 63 million acres (250,000 km^{2}) of land throughout what is now South Dakota, North Dakota and Canada. By the early 19th century, many French Canadian men, mostly fur trappers, had married into Ojibwe families.

The Pembina Band entered into a treaty with the United States in the 1863 Treaty of Old Crossing, together with the Red Lake Band of Chippewa. In 1864, the tribal leader, Esens, also known as Little Shell, walked out of further negotiations and refused to amend the original treaty. In 1892 he sent word to Washington D.C. that he would exchange 52 million acres (210,000 km^{2}) of land and the treaty rights of 1863 for a large reservation, to include the entire Turtle Mountain area, at the price of $1.00 per acre of land.

Senator Porter J. McCumber of North Dakota was sent to meet with the Pembina Band. During the first meeting, when the senator was not present, his agent Waugh offered $0.10 per acre. The Pembina walked out of the meeting in disgust, knowing that the US had paid $1.00 per acre for less valuable land near Fort Berthold. Agent Waugh brought in 32 Ojibwe from Canada and had them sign the treaty, which became known as the McCumber Agreement or the Ten Cent Treaty.

After hearing of the fraud, John Burke, state attorney for Rolette County, North Dakota, agreed to represent Little Shell before the US Senate. Senator McCumber agreed with John Burke that the treaty was a fraud. Nonetheless, the US Senate ratified the treaty after McCumber died in 1905. The federal officials told the Little Shell people to sign the treaty or risk starving to death.

In 1892, the McCumber Agreement between the Turtle Mountain Indians and the Commission, the Turtle Mountain Indian Reservation was established, but many of the Little Shell Band of Chippewa Indians refused settlement there. Some Little Shell members did eventually settle on the Turtle Mountain Indian Reservation. Others migrated north and west into Saskatchewan and Alberta, and then later made their way back south into Montana.

In the mid-19th century, the tribe was numbered at several thousand in the Red River-Pembina region. At that time there was no formal enrollment procedure, no reservation, and thus no documented population.

=== 20th and 21st centuries ===
Beginning in the late 20th century, the people of the tribe reorganized and first obtained state recognition In Montana in the late 1980s when Governor Stan Stephens signed authorizing legislation. The state recognition process formally incorporated the Little Shell Tribe of Chippewa Indians of Montana. They gained federal recognition in December 2019. Along the way, the Little Shell tribe opened a new event center in May 2014, located outside Great Falls, Montana.

== Government ==
Little Shell Tribe Administration Office in Great Falls, Montana

The Tribe maintained its integrity throughout the 20th century, long before federal recognition. The constitution has been revised, most recently in 2016. The government, social structure and culture have been maintained. The Little Shell Tribe is governed by a constitutionally defined elected Tribal Council. The Tribal Chairman is also elected. Four council seats are up for election every 4 years and three council seats every two years, in a largely mail-in balloting process. The tribal council meets regularly in Great Falls at least monthly, and quarterly meetings are held every quarter, in efforts to keep tribal members involved and informed.

The Council are unpaid. Now that the tribe is federally recognized, the Little Shell qualify for federally funded government support services such as housing and medical facilities, typically provided to tribes recognized by the United States government. Little Shell Tribal members can obtain some services available in urban centers as well as public benefits available to all Montana residents.

== Events of interest ==
- Back to Batoche Celebration: An annual gathering of the Little Shell Tribe of Chippewa and sister Tribes of Metis in Canada, commemorating the Riel Rebellion, and including cultural activities, dancing, art and socializing, at Batoche, Saskatchewan.
- Little Shell Pow Wow: Annual tribal pow wow usually occurring the 3rd weekend in August in Great Falls, Montana.

== Notable tribal members ==
- Thomas Little Shell
- Chris La Tray
- Spero M. Manson
