= Lila Walter Evans =

American politician

Member of the Montana House of Representatives from the 16 district
- In office January 3, 2011 – January 7, 2013
- Preceded by: Shannon Augare
- Succeeded by: Lea Whitford

Personal details
- Party: Republican
- Profession: Business owner

Lila Walter Evans is a former Republican member of the Montana House of Representatives, who represented District 16 from 2011 to 2013. She was defeated for re-election in 2012 by Lea Whitford, by a margin of 1,823 to 935.
