= Shannon Augare =

American politician

Member of the Montana Senate from the 8th district
- In office January 3, 2011 – January 5, 2015
- Preceded by: Carol Juneau
- Succeeded by: Lea Whitford

Member of the Montana House of Representatives from the 16th district
- In office January 3, 2007 – January 3, 2011
- Succeeded by: Lila Evans

Personal details
- Party: Democratic Party

Shannon James Augare was a Democratic member of the Montana Legislature. He was elected for Senate District 8 in 2010. He did not run for re-election in 2014. Previously, he served in the Montana House of Representatives, representing District 16 from 2007 until the end of 2010.

== See also ==
- List of Native American politicians
- Native American women in politics
