= Turtle Mountain Band of Chippewa Indians =

Native American tribe

Mikinaakwajiw-ininiwag
- Tribal flag

- Turtle Mountain Band of Chippewa Indians logo

Total population
- 30,000

Regions with significant populations
- Turtle Mountain Indian Reservation, North Dakota, United States

Languages
- English, Ojibwe, Michif

Religion
- Catholicism, Methodism, Midewiwin

Related ethnic groups
- Chippewa Cree, Ottawa, Potawatomi, Métis

The Turtle Mountain Band of Chippewa Indians (Ojibwe: Mikinaakwajiw-ininiwag) is a federally recognized Native American tribe of Ojibwe based on the Turtle Mountain Indian Reservation in Belcourt, North Dakota. The tribe has 30,000 enrolled members. A population of 5,815 reside on the main reservation and another 2,516 reside on off-reservation trust land (as of the 2000 census).

== History ==
Around the end of the 18th century, prior to the advent of white traders in the area, the Ojibwe, an Indigenous people of the Northeastern Woodlands, who had been in what is now Minnesota, Wisconsin, and Michigan, moved out onto the Great Plains in pursuit of the bison and beaver for hunting and commercial trade. They successfully adapted their culture to life on the Great Plains. They adopted horses and developed the bison-hide tipi, the Red River cart, hard-soled footwear, and new ceremonies.

By around 1800, these Indians were hunting in the Turtle Mountain area of present-day North Dakota.

For more than a century, as there was no international boundary, the Chippewa moved freely between what would become Manitoba, Canada, and the United States including Minnesota, North Dakota, and Montana. There they mingled with Cree and other tribes in the area. Running battles with the Dakota over territorial disputes, were finally settled in 1858 with the signing of the Sweet Corn Treaty which described the 11,000,000 acres of the Chippewa domain and provided for reparations. The agreement was signed by Mattonwakan, Chief of the Yanktons and La Terre Qui Purle, Chief of the Sisseton Oyate, Chief Wilkie (Narbexxa) of the Chippewa and witnessed by many members of both tribes.

By 1863, the Chippewa domain encompassed nearly one-third of the land in what would become North Dakota. White settlers, wanting to take advantage of the Homestead Act petitioned Congress to open up the Red River valley for agriculture and to make treaties with Native people. On 2 October 1863, at the Old Crossing of the Red Lake River in Minnesota, Red Lake chiefs Monsomo (Moose Dung), Kaw-was-ke-ne-kay (Broken Arm), May-dwa-gum-on-ind (He That Is Spoken To) and Leading Feather, along with chiefs of the Pembina Band, Ase-anse (Little Shell II) and Miscomukquah (Red Bear) met with Alexander Ramsey and Ashley C. Morrill, commissioners for the Government, to negotiate the Treaty of Old Crossing. The government secured all 11 million acres obtained in the Sweet Corn Treaty to open it up to settlement. The Chippewa signed the treaty under duress.

The 1869–1870 Red River Rebellion was a series of events that started when the Hudson's Bay Company transferred the North-Western Territory trapping franchise to Canada. As a result, Louis Riel and his Métis followers seized Fort Garry on 2 November 1869, and attempted to establish a provisional government for the territory of Manitoba. When Canadian troops arrived, Riel fled to the sanctuary of Montana, married, and became a US Citizen. In 1885, a group of Métis from Prince Albert, Canada asked for his assistance in settling grievances between the Métis and settlers. Riel drafted a petition, but fighting broke out, and he became wanted. Riel surrendered and was tried for treason. He was found guilty and hanged causing his followers to flee and seek refuge with the Turtle Mountain Chippewa.

As the fur trade and buffalo hunting diminished available resources, the landless Turtle Mountain Chippewas, though recognized by the Government, found it difficult to ward off starvation. In an effort to provide them with a reservation, Congress approved the purchase on 3 March 1873, of lands on the White Earth Reservation in Minnesota and attempted to relocate the tribe. The Chippewa refused to move and insisted on remaining in the Turtle Mountains. In June 1884, an agreement had set aside a reservation 12 miles by 6 miles which was being occupied by the Turtle Mountain Band, but by 1891, again the US wanted a land cession.

In 1891, Agent Waugh of Fort Totten, convened a committee of 16 full bloods and 16 mixed bloods to take a census of the Chippewa and set boundaries for a new reservation. Little Shell III wanted to obtain a 30 square mile tract at Turtle Mountain, but when that proposal was rejected, he and his followers abandoned the meeting. The McCumber Agreement was reached on 22 October 1892, which granted two townships within the traditional area ceding all other lands the Chippewa might possess in North Dakota. The land granted was inadequate to meet the needs of granting allotments to all tribal members, so negotiations continued. Finally in 1904, Article VI was added which provided that "All members of the Turtle Mountain Band of Chippewas who may be unable to secure land upon the reservation above ceded may take homesteads upon any vacant land belonging to the United States without charge, and shall continue to hold and be entitled to such share in all tribal funds, annuities, or other property, the same as if located on the reservations." With this provision, the Chippewa agreed to the terms and the final agreement was ratified by Congress on 21 April 1904.

In the decades after signing the McCumber agreement and the Great Depression, the Chippewa adopted farming and gardening as a way of survival. They developed a Big Store in 1922 to sell goods and operated a creamery. They sold farm goods, chopped lumber, farm labor and medicinal herbs. Under the WPA, men gained training in construction jobs and women learned to sew and can goods. Congress approved the first charter of the Turtle Mountain Chippewa in 1932 and because of their successful endeavors and distrust of government programs, the tribe chose not to participate in setting up a new government under the Indian Reorganization Act.

The tribe filed numerous claims for compensation of having been forced to accept a below market value settlement on the lands they ceded to the US in the McCumber Agreement. In 1934, Congress passed a law for the Indian Court of Claims to determine a settlement with the Chippewa, but it was vetoed by President Franklin D. Roosevelt in May 1934. A second attempt was also vetoed by the president in June 1934. Finally in 1946, Congress established the Indian Claims Commission. The tribe filed a claims petition in 1948. On 9 June 1964 an Act established their claim and a method of distribution of the judgment award.

In the early 1950s, federal policy changed and the government proposed that some tribes would have their special relationships with the federal government terminated. The intent was to declare these tribes successful in having made progress in assimilation and judged no longer needing special status. On 1 August 1953, the US Congress passed House Concurrent Resolution 108 which called for the immediate termination of the Flathead, Klamath, Menominee, Potawatomi, and Turtle Mountain Chippewa, as well as all tribes in the states of California, New York, Florida, and Texas. Termination of a tribe meant the immediate withdrawal of all federal aid, services, and protection, as well as the end of reservations. Though termination legislation was introduced (Legislation 4. S. 2748, H.R. 7316. 83rd Congress. Termination of Federal Supervision over Turtle Mountain Band of Chippewa Indians), the law was not implemented. In 1954, at the Congressional hearings for the Turtle Mountain Band of Chippewa Indians, tribal Chairman Patrick Gourneau and a delegation spoke in Washington, DC. They testified that the group was not financially prepared, had high unemployment and poverty, suffered from low education levels, and said that termination would be devastating to the tribe. Based on their testimony, the Chippewa were dropped from the tribes to be terminated. A fictionalized account of these events is featured in Louise Erdrich's novel, “The Night Watchman,” which won the Pulitzer Prize in 2021.

=== Ban on hydraulic fracturing ===
On November 22, 2011, the Turtle Mountain Chippewa Tribal Council was unanimous in banning hydraulic fracturing (fracking) to exploit oil reserves; the sovereign nation was the first tribe to do so out of concern for the adverse environmental effects of this practice. They passed a tribal resolution drafted by No Fracking Way Turtle Mountain Tribe, a grassroots group.

The Tribal Council amended this resolution to direct the Bureau of Indian Affairs (BIA) to cancel oil and gas bidding on 45,000 acres of tribal land that was scheduled to begin on December 14, 2011. The BIA cancelled the bids on December 9, 2011.

== Bands ==
As the fur trade dwindled, many of the bands from the Red, Rainy, Leech and Sandy Lakes areas who had settled near the Post, drifted back into Minnesota and North Dakota. One band, the Mikinak-wastsha-anishinabe, established their community in the Turtle Mountains. In an 1849 letter, Canadian Catholic priest, Father Belcourt, described the people of the Pembina Territory in 1849 as being from Red Lake, Reed Lake, Pembina, and Turtle Mountain bands, mixed with biracial Métis, who he said far outnumbered those of majority Chippewa ancestry.

In 2003 a United States court ruled that the Little Shell Band of Chippewa Indians (of Montana) is a separate tribe, in keeping with their documentation: this band had developed independently and created a separate government since the 1890s and relocation to Montana. The courts have recognized three independent units claiming the name Chippewa, and several unassociated members of that band. This case refers to cases of the Indian Claims Commission and United States Court of Claims, which can no longer be found online at their original sources, as the cases are old.

== Economy ==
The tribe has founded the Turtle Mountain College, one of numerous tribal colleges established by tribes in the United States.

The tribe has established online, short-term installment loans as a business to serve underbanked Americans. The business has brought new employment opportunities and has generated financial support for other tribal business ventures and social programs for the reservation. The tribe established BlueChip Financial in 2012, which is based on the reservation in Belcourt, North Dakota. It employs more than two dozen enrolled tribal members. BlueChip Financial is doing business under the Spotloan.com brand. Since launch, the company has made 250,000 loans.

Other tribes that have also set up programs of online short-term lending include the Habematolel Pomo of Upper Lake, the Otoe-Missouria Tribe, the Chippewa Cree Tribe, the Miami Tribe of Oklahoma, the Fort Belknap Indian Community in Montana, and the Santee Sioux Nation of Nebraska.

The Native American Financial Services Association (NAFSA) says, “Tribal online lending provides a critical economic lifeline for sovereign tribes in remote areas, whether or not they engage in tribal government gaming. While many out-of-the-way tribal communities have developed gaming facilities as a way to create jobs and generate essential government revenues, remote reservations and gaming properties have been more severely impacted by the economic downturn."

There is high unemployment and poverty rates within the tribes and according to U.S. News & World Report and Pew Research “more than 1 in 4 Native people live in poverty and labor force participation rate – which measures the share of adults either working or looking for a job – is 61.6 percent, the lowest for all race and ethnicity groups.”

Delvin Cree, a writer with The Tribal Independent, criticized such tribal lending in an opinion piece published on Indianz.com in February 2012, describing it as predatory lending. On the other hand, The Wall Street Journal and other publications have written about how tribal online lending programs have generated funds for much-needed economic development to tribes without many other economic development opportunities.

Chairperson Sherry Treppa of the Habematolel Pomo of Upper Lake testified before the US House Committee on Financial Services regarding tribal online small dollar lending programs becoming a vital part of many tribes’ economic development strategies, saying that they provided much-needed jobs and revenue. She also argued that attempts to regulate tribes engaging in online lending is an attack on state and tribal sovereignty.

In addressing tribal sovereignty and the relationship with the Consumer Financial Protection Bureau (CFPB), Saba Bazzazieh argues that “the bureau has disregarded tribal sovereignty since its creation, the problem has recently reached an all-time high.” Additionally, “the bureau has demonstrated a patent misunderstanding of what tribal sovereignty actually means in practice, including the fundamentally important issue of preemption of state law.”

In 2016, Gavin Clarkson wrote an analysis on the law and economics of tribal online lending programs, finding that the programs were lawful. Its title is "Online Sovereignty: The Law and Economics of Tribal Electronic Commerce.” In this analysis Clarkson also identified ways in which lending has supported the tribal economies to include employment, infrastructure, education, healthcare, tribal services and social services. He notes that “many tribes participating in tribal lending have few other options in the wake of federal funding shortfalls and shrinking tribal budgets.”

== Significant locations associated with the tribe ==
- Belcourt
- Dunseith
- St. Joseph (Walhalla)(Red Bear's Reservation)
- Pembina
- St. John
- Stump Lake (Black Duck's village)
- Grahams Island (Little Shell's Village)
- Round Lake village
- Buffalo Lodge
- White Earth River region
- Trenton / Buford region (TISA)
- Dogden Buttes
- Strawberry Lake

== Notable tribal members ==
- Barbara K. Charbonneau-Dahlen, PhD RN, nurse, advocate
- Heid E. Erdrich, author, poet
- Louise Erdrich, author
- Kade Ferris, historian and author
- William Gardner (1884–1965), one of the Untouchables
- David T. McCoy, attorney and state politician in North Carolina
- Leonard Peltier, American Indian Movement member and author
- Mark Turcotte, poet
- Waubojeeg ("White Feather", "King Fisher") (c. 1747–1793), chief and warrior
- Miskwaadesi-Ikwe ("Painted Turtle Woman") National Healthcare Consultant and Owner of Consultants for Long Term Care, Inc.
- SaNoah LaRocque, Miss North Dakota USA 2022
- Dexter Davis, Lieutenant, Bureau of Indian Affairs, awarded the Federal Law Enforcement Congressional Badge of Bravery (2019), He is considered the first enrolled member of a Federally recognized tribe, the first BIA law enforcement officer, and the first North Dakotan to receive the award
- Jessica Metcalfe, art historian, educator, and entrepreneur known for her work on Native American fashion and for founding Beyond Buckskin.
