= Blackfeet Community College =

Tribal land-grant community college in Browning, Montana, U.S.

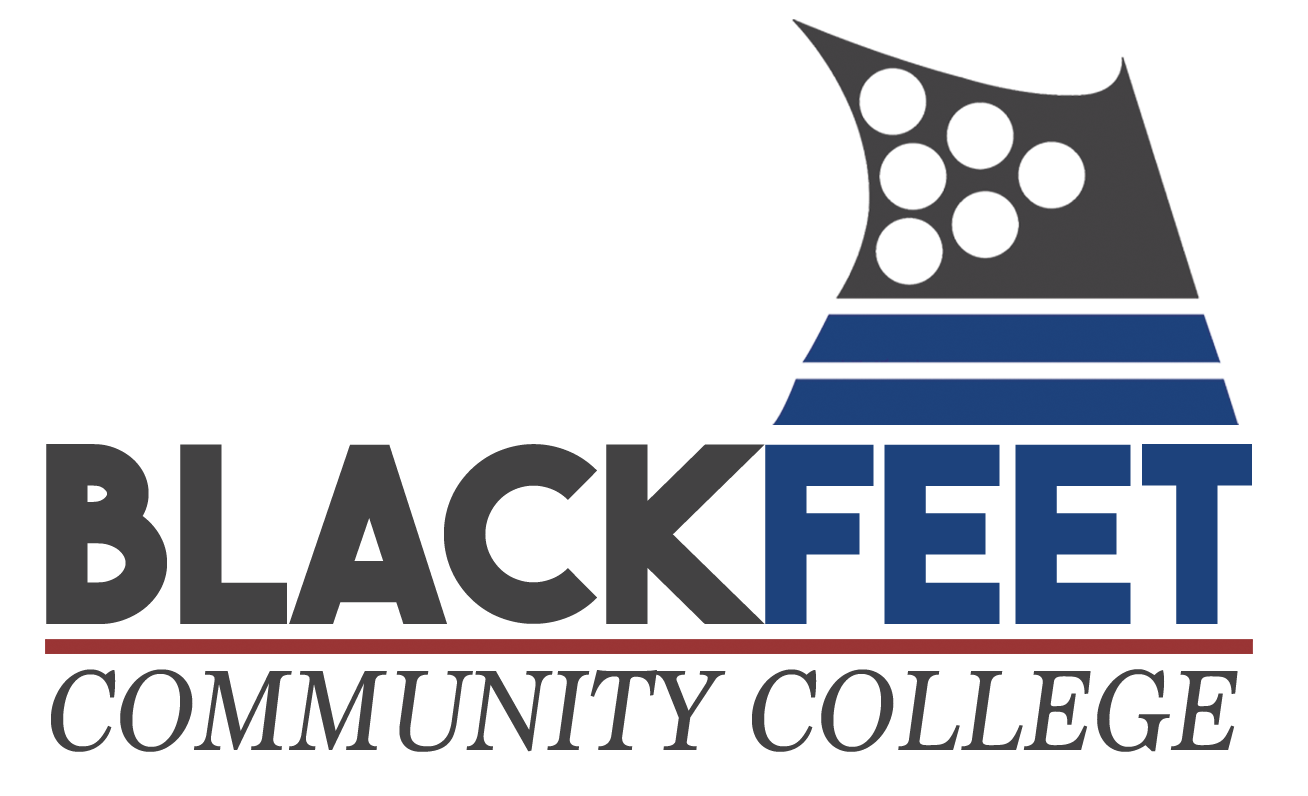
- Motto: Remember Our Past ... Build Our Future
- Type: Private tribal land-grant community college
- Established: 1974
- Affiliations: Blackfeet tribal affiliation
- Academic affiliations: American Indian Higher Education Consortium; American Association of Community Colleges; Space-grant
- President: Brad Hall
- Students: 2,240
- Location: Browning, Montana, United States; 48°33′11″N 113°00′34″W
- Website: http://www.bfcc.edu/

Blackfeet Community College is a private tribal land-grant community college on the Blackfeet reservation in Browning, Montana. The Blackfeet reservation occupies an area of 1,525,712 acres adjacent to Glacier National Park, Lewis and Clark National Forest, and the province of Alberta, Canada. In 1994, the college was designated a land-grant college alongside 31 other tribal colleges.

== Campus ==
The BCC campus is located on the south end of Browning, the trade/service center for the reservation, just off Highways 2 & 89. The campus consists of thirteen buildings used for administration, student services, academic affairs, vocational education departments, classrooms, various programs, and the library.

== Partnership ==
BCC is a member of the American Indian Higher Education Consortium (AIHEC), a community of tribally and federally chartered institutions working to strengthen tribal nations and make a lasting difference in the lives of American Indians and Alaska Natives. BCC was created in response to the higher education needs of American Indians. BCC generally serves geographically isolated populations that have no other means of accessing education beyond the high school level.
