= National Register of Historic Places listings in Chouteau County, Montana =

Location of Chouteau County in Montana

This is a list of the National Register of Historic Places listings in Chouteau County, Montana. It is intended to be a complete list of the properties and districts on the National Register of Historic Places in Chouteau County, Montana, United States. The locations of National Register properties and districts for which the latitude and longitude coordinates are included below, may be seen in a map.

There are 21 properties and districts listed on the National Register in the county, including 1 National Historic Landmark.

This National Park Service list is complete through NPS recent listings posted October 16, 2026.

== Listings county-wide ==
	Name on the Register	Image	Date listed	Location	City or town	Description
1	I.G. Baker House	I.G. Baker House	November 20, 1980 (#80002403)	1604 Front St. 47°49′08″N 110°39′35″W	Fort Benton	
2	Chouteau County Courthouse	Chouteau County Courthouse	September 29, 1980 (#80002404)	1308 Franklin St. 47°49′03″N 110°39′53″W	Fort Benton	
3	Citadel Rock	Citadel Rock	November 13, 1974 (#74001095)	East of Fort Benton; 47°49′52″N 110°04′28″W	Fort Benton	
4	Eagle Butte School		January 28, 2009 (#08001383)	Eagle Butte School Rd., 23 miles off Montana Highway 80; 47°53′09″N 110°10′12″W	Fort Benton	
5	First National Bank of Geraldine	First National Bank of Geraldine	January 9, 2008 (#07001363)	311 Main St. 47°36′09″N 110°15′53″W	Geraldine	
6	Fort Benton	Fort Benton	October 15, 1966 (#66000431)	Front St. (1220 through 1900 block) levee, and bridge 47°49′04″N 110°40′02″W	Fort Benton	
7	Fort Benton Bridge	Fort Benton Bridge	August 6, 1980 (#80002406)	Spans the Missouri River; 47°49′02″N 110°39′38″W	Fort Benton	
8	Fort Benton Engine House	Fort Benton Engine House	November 20, 1980 (#80002407)	Front and 15th Sts. 47°49′02″N 110°39′38″W	Fort Benton	
9	Geraldine Milwaukee Depot	Geraldine Milwaukee Depot	March 21, 1997 (#97000254)	Railroad Ave., approximately 10 miles south of Montana Highway 80; 47°36′14″N 110°15′55″W	Geraldine	
10	Grand Union Hotel	Grand Union Hotel	January 2, 1976 (#76001121)	14th and Front Sts. 47°48′52″N 110°40′08″W	Fort Benton	
11	Judith Landing Historic District	Judith Landing Historic District	December 6, 1975 (#75001081)	Upper Missouri River Breaks National Monument; 47°44′14″N 109°37′34″W	Winifred	Historic site managed by BLM; extends into Fergus County. Boundary increase on 2014-04-11.
12	Lewis and Clark Camp at Slaughter River	Lewis and Clark Camp at Slaughter River	December 16, 1974 (#74001094)	40 miles south of the Big Sandy River on the Missouri River; 47°43′04″N 109°50′59″W	Big Sandy	
13	Lonetree	Lonetree	September 11, 1980 (#80002410)	South of Geraldine; 47°32′37″N 110°17′21″W	Geraldine	
14	Masonic Building	Masonic Building	October 14, 1980 (#80002408)	1418 Front St. 47°49′03″N 110°39′41″W	Fort Benton	
15	St. Paul's Episcopal Church	St. Paul's Episcopal Church	September 29, 1980 (#80002409)	14th and Chouteau Sts. 47°49′06″N 110°39′58″W	Fort Benton	
16	Shonkin Creek Bridge		March 26, 2012 (#12000169)	Approximately mile 21 on Shonkin Rd. 47°33′57″N 110°33′11″W	Geraldine vicinity	part of the Montana's Steel Stringer and Steel Girder Bridges MPS
17	Square Butte Jail	Square Butte Jail	July 23, 1998 (#98000888)	Salsbury Ave. 47°31′02″N 110°11′52″W	Square Butte	
18	Square Butte School	Square Butte School	July 15, 2013 (#13000496)	Northwest corner of Diederick St. and Broadway; 47°31′00″N 110°12′08″W	Square Butte	
19	Teton River Crossing on the Whoop-Up Trail	Teton River Crossing on the Whoop-Up Trail	April 15, 1993 (#93000275)	Address restricted	Carter	
20	Virgelle Mercantile and Virgelle State Bank	Virgelle Mercantile and Virgelle State Bank	April 15, 1997 (#97000315)	County Road 430, approximately 6.3 miles south of U.S. Route 87; 48°00′57″N 110°14′55″W	Virgelle	
21	West Quincy Granite Quarry		March 3, 2000 (#00000163)	Flat Creek Rd. 47°32′42″N 110°16′58″W	Square Butte	

== Former listings ==
	Name on the Register	Image	Date listed	Date removed	Location	City or town	Description
1	Chouteau County Jail		August 11, 1980 (#80002405)	June 3, 1986	Washington and Fourteenth Sts.	Fort Benton	Demolished in 1986.

== See also ==
- List of National Historic Landmarks in Montana
- National Register of Historic Places listings in Montana
