= Virgelle Ferry =

Ferry located on the Missouri River in Choteau County, Montana

The Virgelle Ferry is a ferry located on the Missouri River in Choteau County, Montana. The ferry helps provide recreation and travel opportunities in the area.

== History ==
The Virgelle Ferry and the nearby Virgelle Mercantile and Bed and Breakfast have been around since 1913, shortly following the foundation of Virgelle, Montana by Virgil and Ella Blankenbaker. The ferry is one of three in the state still in use. The ferry was mainly created due to high traffic of canoeists and local travelers in the area, including those bringing coal out of Coal Banks Landing via steamboats and other vehicles.

== Ferry details ==
The Virgelle Ferry is powered by a diesel engine located in a small house and a power cable. The ferry itself consists of a 50 foot long steel frame and deck with a bridle cable to keep it from flowing away. The ferry has a max capacity of 45,000 pounds. Since its opening, the ferry has successfully carried 30,000 vehicles. It operates from mid April to mid November Monday to Friday 7 a.m. to 7 p.m., and on Sundays it is open 9 a.m. to 5 p.m. However, ice on the river can keep it opened either longer or shorter. Use of the ferry is free.

== Recreational/Facility Details ==
The Virgelle Mercantile and Bed and Breakfast offer purchasable items, lodging, food, and other services at Virgelle. They are operated by Virgelle Merc and Missouri River Canoe Company. Also nearby is Coal Banks Ladning recreational site offering fishing, canoeing, and other activities.

== See also ==
- Carter, Montana
- Fort Benton, Montana
- Upper Missouri Breaks National Monument
- Box Elder, Montana
- Big Sandy, Montana
- Loma, Montana
