= Manlius (disambiguation) =

Manlius may refer to:

== Places in the United States ==
- Manlius, Illinois
- Manlius (town), New York
- Manlius (village), New York
- Manlius Township (disambiguation)
  - Manlius Township, Bureau County, Illinois
  - Manlius Township, LaSalle County, Illinois
  - Manlius Township, Michigan

== Other uses ==
- Manlius (1826 ship)
- Manlius Pebble Hill, a school in DeWitt, New York
- any of various Romans belonging to the gens Manlia
