= Manlius Township, Illinois =

Manlius Township, Illinois may refer to one of the following townships:

- Manlius Township, Bureau County, Illinois
- Manlius Township, LaSalle County, Illinois

See also

- Manlius Township (disambiguation)
