= Milwaukee Bridge & Iron Works =

The Milwaukee Bridge & Iron Works, also known as the Milwaukee Bridge Co. and as Milwaukee Bridge & Iron Co., was a firm based in Milwaukee, Wisconsin.

Projects include:

- Fifty-Seventh Street Bridge, 57th St. over the Kalamazoo R., Manlius Township, MI (Milwaukee Bridge & Iron Co.), NRHP-listed
- Fort Benton Bridge, over Missouri River, Fort Benton, MT (Milwaukee Bridge & Iron Works), NRHP-listed
- Manchester Street Bridge, in Ochsner Park, Baraboo, WI (Milwaukee Bridge & Iron Works), NRHP-listed
- Sappa Creek Bridge, Co. Rd. over Sappa Cr., 2 mi. E of Stamford, Nebraska (Milwaukee Bridge Co.), NRHP-listed
