= Manlius Township =

Manlius Township may refer to the following places in the United States:

- Manlius Township, Bureau County, Illinois
- Manlius Township, LaSalle County, Illinois
- Manlius Township, Michigan

See also

- Manlius (disambiguation)
