= Eagle Butte School =

Eagle Butte School may refer to:

== United States ==
- Cheyenne-Eagle Butte School, In Eagle Butte, South Dakota
- Eagle Butte School, on the NRHP in Chouteau County, Montana
