= Fort Benton Historic District =

Historic district in Montana, United States

- U.S. National Register of Historic Places
- U.S. National Historic Landmark District
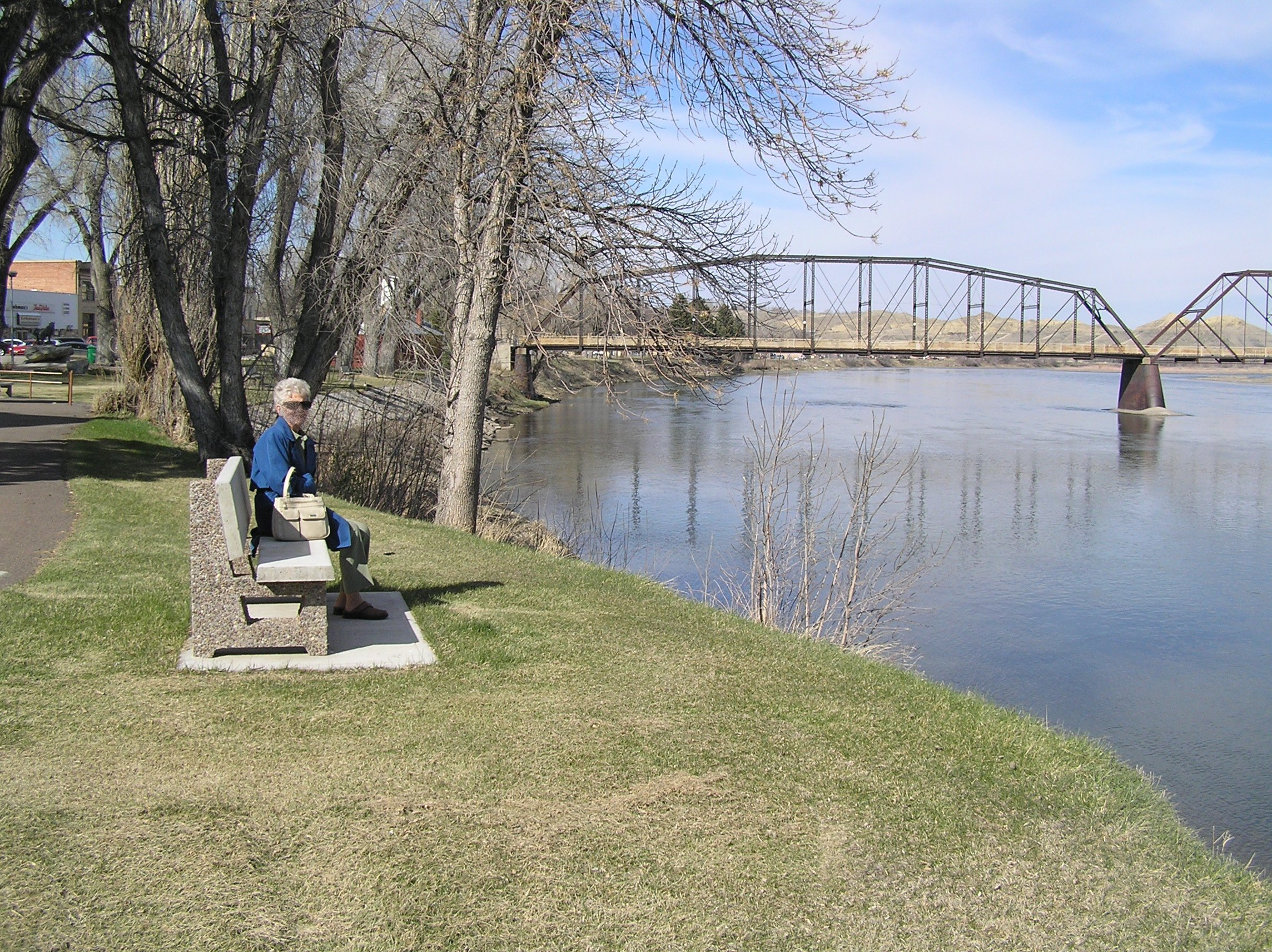
- View of the Fort Benton Bridge and waterfront

- Location within Montana Location within the United States
- Location: Front Street, levee and bridge on the Missouri River, Fort Benton, Montana
- Coordinates: 47°49′10″N 110°40′11″W
- Area: 20.2 acres (8.2 ha)
- NRHP reference No.: 66000431

Significant dates
- Added to NRHP: October 15, 1966
- Designated NHLD: November 5, 1961

The Fort Benton Historic District is a National Historic Landmark District encompassing the historic waterfront areas of Fort Benton, Montana. Founded as a fur trading post at the head of navigation of the Missouri River, it was one of the nation's largest inland ports prior to the advent of the railroad, playing a pivotal role in the development of the American and Canadian West. The Front Street and waterfront area of the city preserves elements of this history. It was designated a National Historic Landmark in 1961, although its boundaries were not formally determined until 2012.

== Description and history ==
Fort Benton was founded in 1846–1848 by Alexander Culbertson, a fur trader working for the Chouteau brothers firm. It was named for Senator Thomas Hart Benton, and was originally little more than a palisaded fort, with the facilities of the trading firm within. At first goods were moved up and down the river by keelboats and other human or animal-powered watercraft. In 1859 the Chouteaus acquired a steamboat, and began service from St. Louis, Missouri. At more than 3000 river miles from the sea, it has been described as "the world's innermost port". From 1860 to 1890 it was one of the principal points of embarkation for supplies and good that drove the development of the American West. Its proximity to Canada meant that goods and supplies also traveled north, helping fuel the growth of cities such as Edmonton, Alberta. Goods were loaded and unloaded on the levee, and merchants managing the trade had their business on Front Street, with homes nearby. The river trade declined in the late 19th century after railroads became a more reliable means of transportation in the region.

The historic district extends along Front Street, from the 1200 to 1900 blocks, and includes the levee along the river bank, and the 1888 Fort Benton Bridge, built in an attempt by the local merchants to maintain the city's influence as the steamboat trade declined. The district includes the site of Fort Benton, which has a surviving element an 1856 blockhouse, the levee, built in 1860, the 1882 Grand Union Hotel, and the Fort Benton Engine House, a fire station that also served as city hall for many years. The 1867 I.G. Baker House is the oldest surviving residence in the district.

== See also ==
- List of National Historic Landmarks in Montana
- National Register of Historic Places listings in Chouteau County, Montana
