= Twin Hills Colony, Montana =

- Census-designated place
- Location within Montana Location within the United States
- Coordinates: 48°01′01″N 111°04′11″W
- Country: United States
- State: Montana
- County: Chouteau

Area
  - Total: 0.37 sq mi (0.95 km^{2})
  - Land: 0.37 sq mi (0.95 km^{2})
  - Water: 0 sq mi (0.00 km^{2})
- Elevation: 3,304 ft (1,007 m)

Population (2020)
  - Total: 39
  - Density: 106.7/sq mi (41.21/km^{2})
- Time zone: UTC-7 (Mountain (MST))
  - Summer (DST): UTC-6 (MDT)
- ZIP Code: 59420 (Carter)
- Area code: 406
- FIPS code: 30-75590
- GNIS feature ID: 2804277

Twin Hills Colony is a Hutterite community and census-designated place (CDP) in Chouteau County, Montana, United States. As of the 2020 census, Twin Hills Colony had a population of 39. It is in the western part of the county, 21 miles (34 km) north of Carter and 47 miles (76 km) north-northeast of Great Falls.

The community was first listed as a CDP prior to the 2020 census.

== Demographics ==
Historical population
Census	Pop.	Note	%±
2020	39		—
U.S. Decennial Census
