= Chouteau County Courthouse =

- U.S. National Register of Historic Places
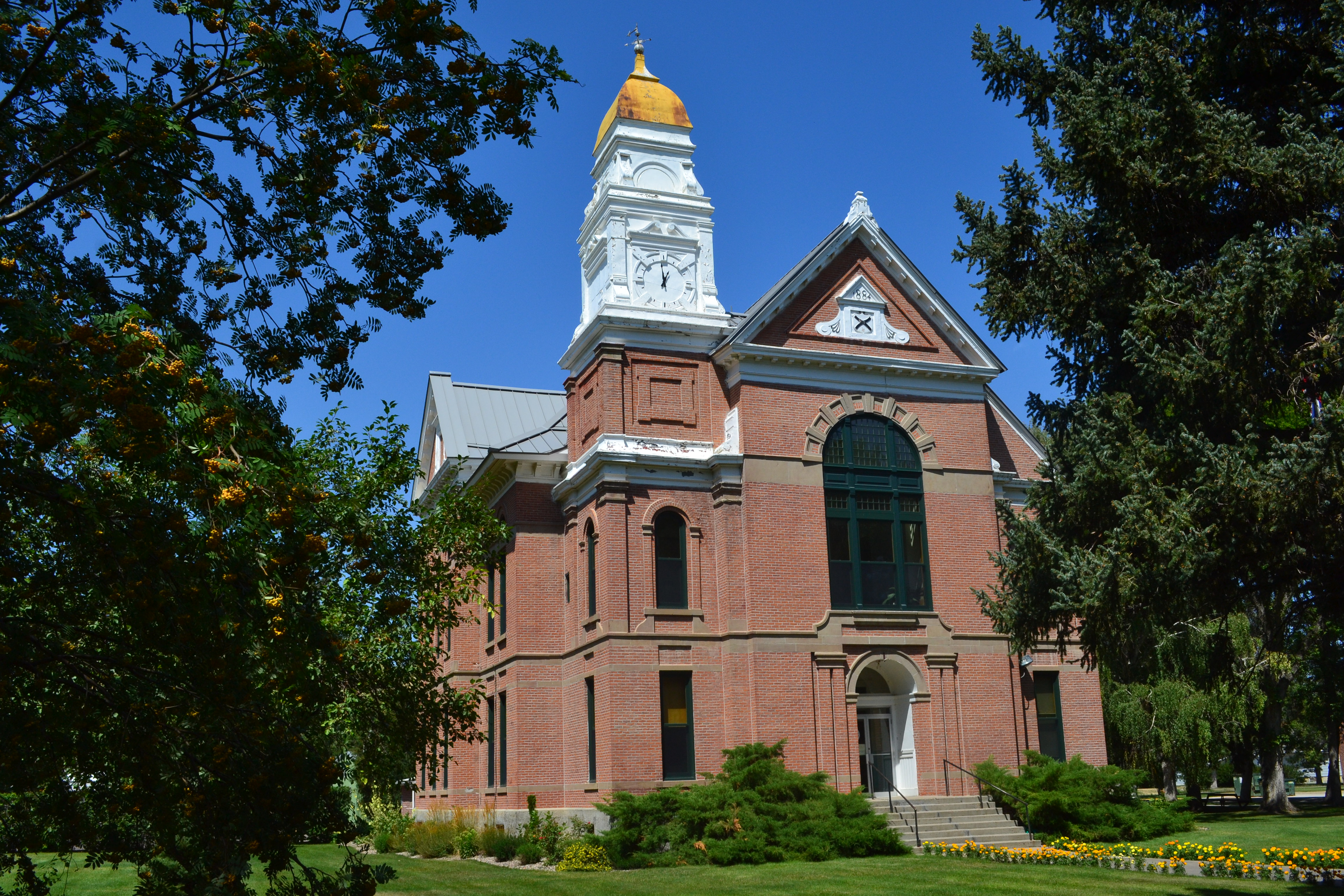
- The courthouse in 2012

- Location within Montana Location within the United States
- Interactive map showing the location of Chouteau County Courthouse
- Location: 1308 Franklin Street, Fort Benton, Montana
- Coordinates: 47°49′03″N 110°39′53″W
- Area: 2 acres (0.81 ha)
- Built: 1883
- Built by: Gus Senieur
- Architect: Kees & Fish
- Architectural style: Queen Anne
- NRHP reference No.: 80002404
- Added to NRHP: September 29, 1980

The Chouteau County Courthouse is a historic building in Fort Benton, Montana. It acts as the county courthouse for Chouteau County, Montana.

Prior to the construction of this courthouse, another courthouse was built for the county in 1880. It burned down in 1883, and this courthouse was built by Gus Senieur a few months later. By 2012, it was the second oldest courthouse in the state of Montana.

The courthouse was designed by Kees & Fish in the Queen Anne architectural style. It has been listed on the National Register of Historic Places since September 29, 1980.
