= Floweree, Montana =

- Unincorporated community
- Location within Montana Location within the United States
- Coordinates: 47°43′29″N 111°01′31″W
- Country: United States
- State: Montana
- County: Chouteau

Area
  - Total: 1.18 sq mi (3.05 km^{2})
  - Land: 1.18 sq mi (3.05 km^{2})
  - Water: 0 sq mi (0.00 km^{2})
- Elevation: 3,232 ft (985 m)

Population (2020)
  - Total: 19
  - Density: 16.1/sq mi (6.23/km^{2})
- Time zone: UTC-7 (Mountain (MST))
  - Summer (DST): UTC-6 (MDT)
- ZIP code: 59440
- Area code: 406
- GNIS feature ID: 2804273

Floweree is an unincorporated community in Chouteau County, Montana, United States. Floweree is 18 miles (29 km) west-southwest of Fort Benton. It is off of U.S. Route 87. As of the 2020 census, Floweree had a population of 19.

The community is named for Daniel Floweree, a Texas cattle rancher who established his F Triangle Ranch in the area in the late 19th century. Floweree had its own post office from 1910 to 2004 and still has its own ZIP code, 59440.

== Demographics ==
Historical population
Census	Pop.	Note	%±
2020	19		—
U.S. Decennial Census
