= Sunnybrook Colony, Montana =

- Census-designated place
- Location within Montana Location within the United States
- Coordinates: 48°09′26″N 110°43′37″W
- Country: United States
- State: Montana
- County: Chouteau

Area
  - Total: 0.24 sq mi (0.62 km^{2})
  - Land: 0.24 sq mi (0.61 km^{2})
  - Water: 0.0039 sq mi (0.01 km^{2})
- Elevation: 3,071 ft (936 m)
  - Density: 0/sq mi (0/km^{2})
- Time zone: UTC-7 (Mountain (MST))
  - Summer (DST): UTC-6 (MDT)
- ZIP Code: 59442 (Fort Benton)
- Area code: 406
- FIPS code: 30-72305
- GNIS feature ID: 2804275

Sunnybrook Colony is a Hutterite community and census-designated place (CDP) in Chouteau County, Montana, United States. It is in the northern part of the county, 32 miles (51 km) north of Fort Benton and 34 miles (55 km) south-southeast of Chester.

The community was first listed as a CDP prior to the 2020 census.

As of the 2020 census, Sunnybrook Colony had a population of 0.

== Demographics ==
Historical population
Census	Pop.	Note	%±
2020	0		—
U.S. Decennial Census
