= Grand Union Hotel (Fort Benton, Montana) =

- U.S. National Register of Historic Places
- U.S. National Historic Landmark District – Contributing property
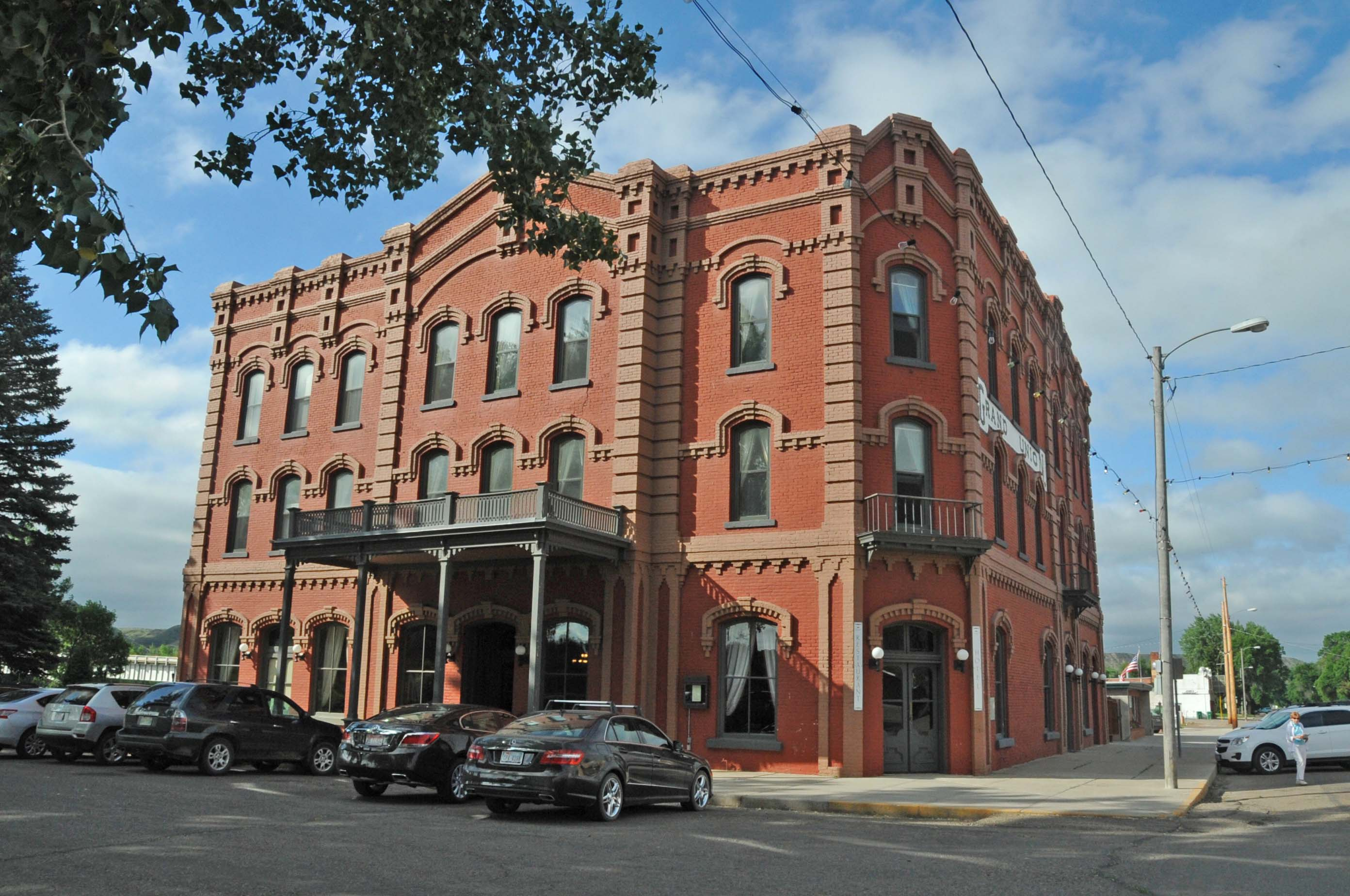
- The hotel in 2013

- Location within Montana Location within the United States
- Location: 14th and Front Streets, Fort Benton, Montana
- Coordinates: 47°48′52″N 110°40′08″W
- Area: 0.3 acres (0.12 ha)
- Built: 1882
- Architect: Thomas Tweedy
- Architectural style: Victorian
- Part of: Fort Benton Historic District (ID66000431)
- NRHP reference No.: 76001121

Significant dates
- Added to NRHP: January 2, 1976
- Designated NHLDCP: November 5, 1961

The Grand Union Hotel is a historic hotel in Fort Benton, Montana. It was built as a luxury hotel prior to the expansion of the railroads to Helena and Great Falls. Construction began in 1881, and it was completed in 1882; the builders included Frank Coombs, W. G. Jones, and others. An inaugural ball was held in 1882, and the hotel celebrated its 125th year in 2007.

The building was designed by architect Thomas Tweedy in the Victorian style. It has been listed on the National Register of Historic Places since January 2, 1976.
