= New Richmond Swing Bridge =

- U.S. National Register of Historic Places
- Michigan State Historic Site
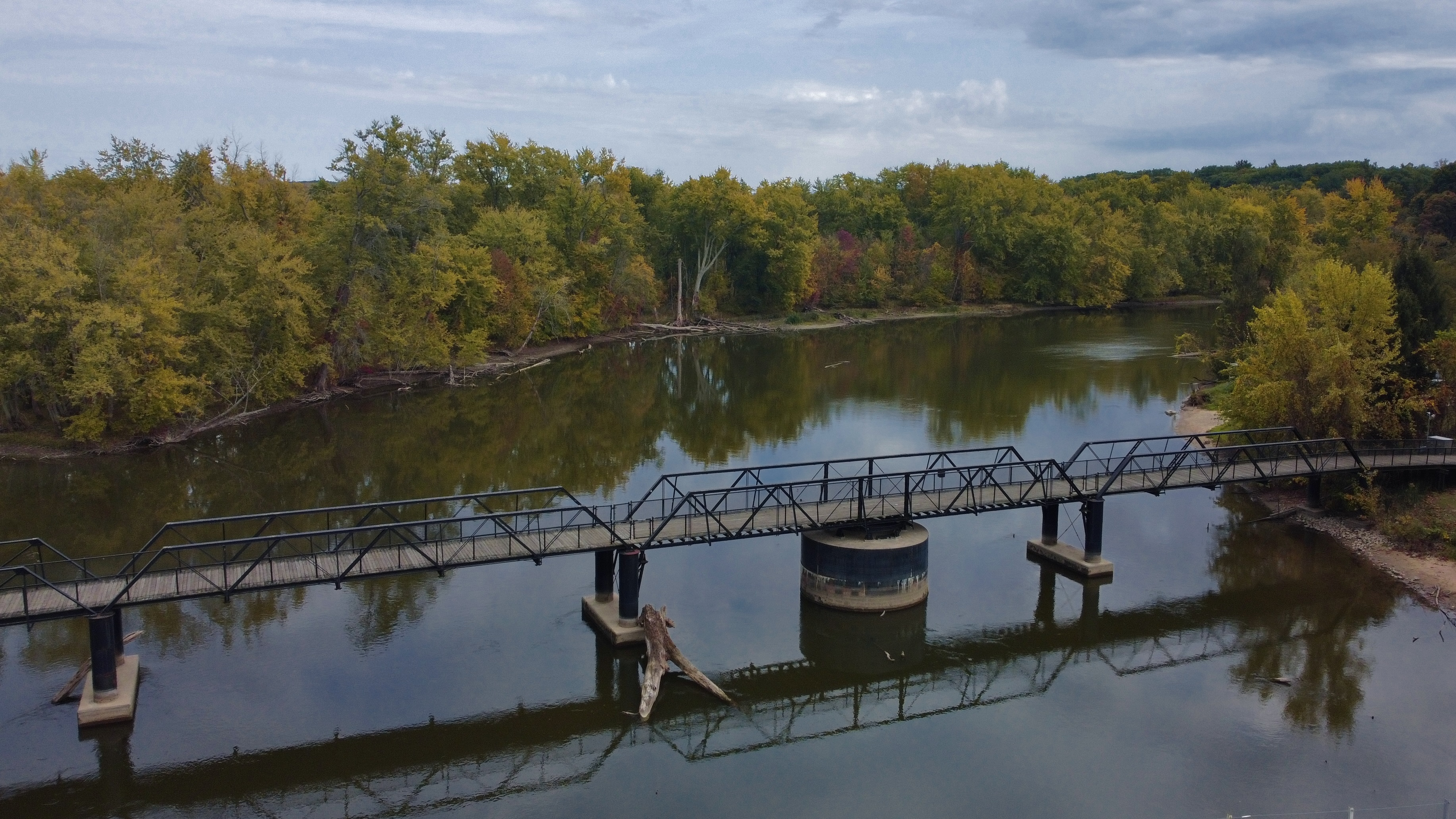

- Location within Michigan Location within the United States
- Interactive map
- Location: Manlius Township, Michigan
- Coordinates: 42°39′5.47″N 86°6′25.17″W
- Built: 1879
- Architect: Milwaukee Bridge & Iron Co.
- NRHP reference No.: 98000273

Significant dates
- Added to NRHP: April 1, 1998
- Designated MSHS: April 4, 1978

The New Richmond Swing Bridge, also known as the Fifty-Seventh Street Bridge, is a one lane swing bridge in Michigan. Located in Allegan County's Manlius Township, it connected 57th Street with Old Allegan Road over the Kalamazoo River until its closure to vehicular traffic. The name New Richmond comes from a former mining town in the area of the same name. The bridge is one of the oldest - if not the oldest - swing bridges extant in the United States, and is one of the oldest metal truss bridges in the state of Michigan and the state's longest pony truss bridge.

== History ==
The first bridge to cross the Kalamazoo River at this location was constructed in 1842, as part of a local highway connecting Allegan with the now-defunct village of Singapore. The 1842 wooden drawbridge was replaced in 1856 with a similar structure. In 1877, part of this bridge collapsed into the river, and by late 1878, preparations were being made to tear down the wooden bridge and replace it with an iron one.

The Milwaukee Bridge & Iron Company was contracted to build the superstructure of the present bridge, made of iron and with a swinging section to allow passage of vessels through the river below, as that section of the river was considered navigable to smaller commercial craft at the time. The first shipment of iron arrived in February 1879, and the bridge was completed later that year.

The bridge was repaired in 1899, replacing one of the spans. River traffic declined to a trickle in the late 1800s and early 1900s, and the need to open the bridge to allow for river traffic evaporated. The manually operated swing span was last used at some point around 1920. In 1975, a new river crossing was constructed on 58th Street, only 1/2 mile from the 57th Street bridge. In 1976, the 57th Street bridge was closed due to its deterioration, but over the next few years it was rehabilitated and reconstructed, and was reopened to vehicular traffic in 1979.

The bridge was again closed to vehicular traffic in 1997 for safety reasons. In 2004, the bridge was again restored, and is now used for pedestrians at the New Richmond Park to access parkland on both sides of the river. In 2010, the bridge was designated as a Michigan Historic Civil Engineering Landmark by the American Society of Civil Engineers.

== Description ==
The New Richmond Swing Bridge has four main spans, plus eight short approach spans, totaling 422 feet (129 m) in length. The four main spans include an 89 feet (27 m) long pinned Warren pony truss swing span, two 70 feet (21 m) long pinned Warren pony truss spans on either side, and an additional 51 feet (16 m) long rivetted Warren pony truss span (repaired in 1899). On the south side, two 24 feet (7.3 m) long approach spans slope upward to meet the bridge, which sits on a concrete abutment. On the north side, six short-span steel stringer structures, each 12 feet (3.7 m) to 16 feet (4.9 m) long, approach the bridge, again on concrete abutments.

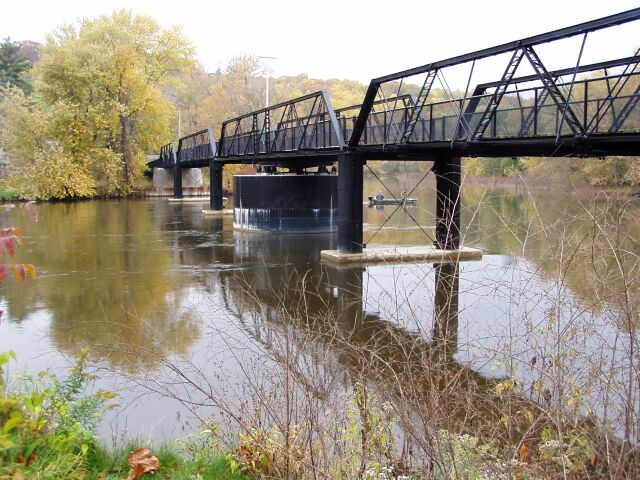
Swing Pivot (still in use by request)

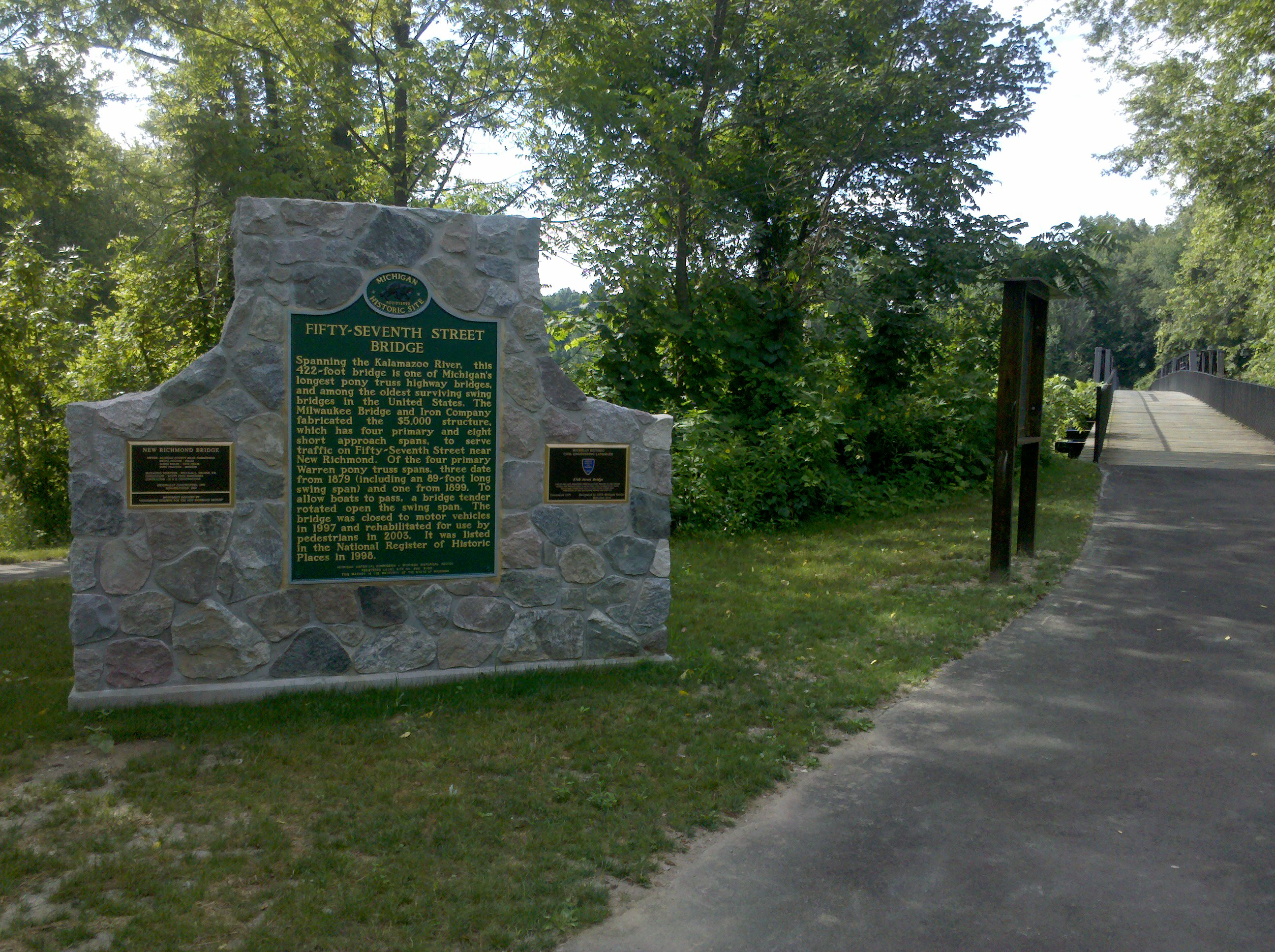
Historical marker
