= Manchester Street Bridge =

- U.S. National Register of Historic Places
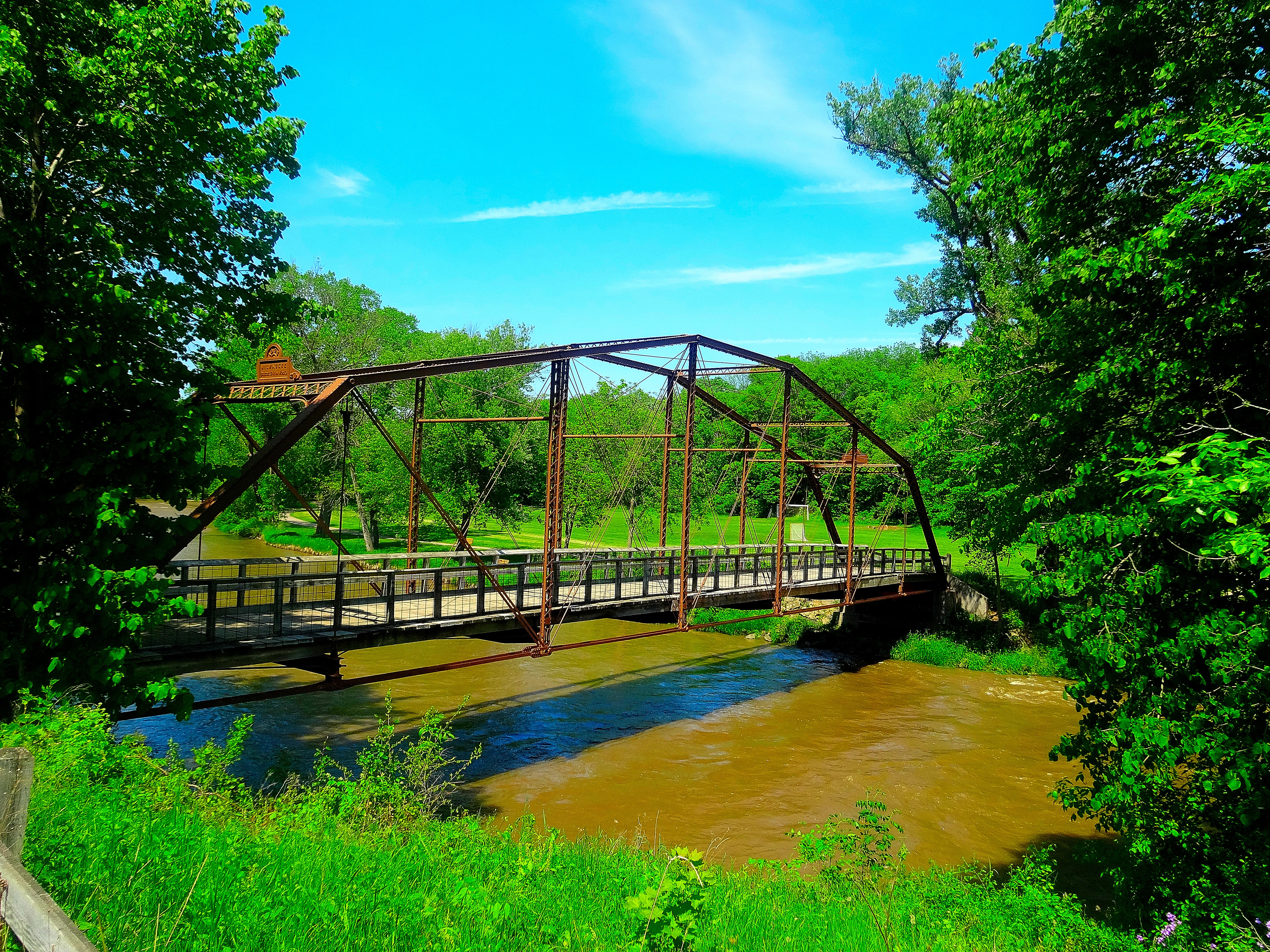

- Location within Wisconsin
- Location: Ochsner Park, Baraboo, Wisconsin
- Coordinates: 43.471128°N 89.756424°W
- Built: 1884
- Built by: Milwaukee Bridge & Iron Works
- Architectural style: Camelback truss
- NRHP reference No.: 88002005
- Added to NRHP: October 13, 1988

The Manchester Street Bridge is a camelback steel truss bridge in Baraboo, Sauk County, Wisconsin, United States. The bridge was constructed in 1884 by the Milwaukee Bridge & Iron Works to carry Manchester Street over the Baraboo River. It replaced an earlier bridge that was destroyed by a flood; the first bridge was likely built after 1877 based on maps from the period. The bridge is 128 feet (39 m) long and 14 feet 2 inches (4.32 m) wide. It is one of two camelback truss bridges remaining in Wisconsin and the only one from the 19th century. In 1987 it was moved to Ochsner Park where it was placed on new abutments while still spanning the Baraboo River as pedestrian bridge.

The bridge was added to the National Register of Historic Places on October 13, 1988.

== See also ==
- List of bridges documented by the Historic American Engineering Record in Wisconsin
