= Square Butte, Montana =

- Census-designated place
- Location within Montana Location within the United States
- Coordinates: 47°30′51″N 110°11′57″W
- Country: United States
- State: Montana
- County: Chouteau

Area
  - Total: 0.27 sq mi (0.71 km^{2})
  - Land: 0.27 sq mi (0.71 km^{2})
  - Water: 0 sq mi (0.00 km^{2})
- Elevation: 3,140 ft (960 m)

Population (2020)
  - Total: 27
  - Density: 98.1/sq mi (37.87/km^{2})
- Time zone: UTC-7 (Mountain (MST))
  - Summer (DST): UTC-6 (MDT)
- Area code: 406
- GNIS feature ID: 2804274

Square Butte is an unincorporated community and Census-designated place in Chouteau County, Montana, United States, named for the unique rock formation of the same name slightly southwest of the town. Square Butte is located along Montana Highway 80, 6.8 miles (10.9 km) south-southeast of Geraldine. As of the 2020 census, Square Butte had a population of 27.

The Square Butte Jail, Square Butte School, and West Quincy Granite Quarry, all of which are listed on the National Register of Historic Places, are located in Square Butte.

== Demographics ==
Historical population
Census	Pop.	Note	%±
2020	27		—
U.S. Decennial Census
