= Parker School, Montana =

- Census-designated place
- Location of Parker School, Montana
- Coordinates: 48°14′53″N 109°44′32″W
- Country: United States
- State: Montana
- Counties: Hill, Chouteau

Area
  - Total: 7.39 sq mi (19.14 km^{2})
  - Land: 7.39 sq mi (19.14 km^{2})
  - Water: 0 sq mi (0.00 km^{2})
- Elevation: 4,078 ft (1,243 m)

Population (2020)
  - Total: 388
  - Density: 52.5/sq mi (20.28/km^{2})
- Time zone: UTC-7 (Mountain (MST))
  - Summer (DST): UTC-6 (MDT)
- Area code: 406
- FIPS code: 30-56650
- GNIS feature ID: 2409029

Parker School is a census-designated place (CDP) in Hill and Chouteau counties in the U.S. state of Montana. As of the 2020 census, Parker School had a population of 388.

== Geography ==
Parker School is located in southeastern Hill County and extends south into Chouteau County. The CDP is part of the Rocky Boy Indian Reservation.

According to the United States Census Bureau, the CDP has a total area of 7.4 square miles (19.1 km^{2}), all land.

== Demographics ==
Historical population
Census	Pop.	Note	%±
2020	388		—
U.S. Decennial Census

As of the census of 2000, there were 352 people, 78 households, and 69 families residing in the CDP. The population density was 45.0 inhabitants per square mile (17.4/km^{2}). There were 82 housing units at an average density of 10.5/sq mi (4.0/km^{2}). The racial makeup of the CDP was 97.73% Native American, 1.99% White, and 0.28% Pacific Islander. Hispanic or Latino of any race were 1.70% of the population.

There were 78 households, out of which 60.3% had children under the age of 18 living with them, 57.7% were married couples living together, 16.7% had a female householder with no husband present, and 11.5% were non-families. 10.3% of all households were made up of individuals, and 1.3% had someone living alone who was 65 years of age or older. The average household size was 4.51 and the average family size was 4.84.

In the CDP, the population was spread out, with 47.2% under the age of 18, 10.8% from 18 to 24, 24.4% from 25 to 44, 14.2% from 45 to 64, and 3.4% who were 65 years of age or older. The median age was 20 years. For every 100 females, there were 113.3 males. For every 100 females age 18 and over, there were 118.8 males.

The median income for a household in the CDP was $29,167, and the median income for a family was $37,917. Males had a median income of $18,750 versus $40,500 for females. The per capita income for the CDP was $7,453. About 30.0% of families and 25.0% of the population were below the poverty line, including 24.1% of those under age 18 and 57.1% of those age 65 or over.
