= Highwood, Montana =

- Census-designated place
- Location of Highwood, Montana
- Coordinates: 47°36′10″N 110°44′35″W
- Country: United States
- State: Montana
- County: Chouteau

Area
  - Total: 5.18 sq mi (13.41 km^{2})
  - Land: 5.18 sq mi (13.41 km^{2})
  - Water: 0 sq mi (0.00 km^{2})
- Elevation: 3,711 ft (1,131 m)

Population (2020)
  - Total: 165
  - Density: 31.9/sq mi (12.31/km^{2})
- Time zone: UTC-7 (Mountain (MST))
  - Summer (DST): UTC-6 (MDT)
- ZIP code: 59450
- Area code: 406
- FIPS code: 30-36250
- GNIS feature ID: 2408388

Highwood is an unincorporated community and census-designated place (CDP) in Chouteau County, Montana, United States. The population was 165 at the 2020 Dicennial Census.

== History ==
Highwood first had a post office in 1881, which closed and reopened a few times until 1886, since which it has remained open continuously. The community took its name from nearby Highwood Creek.

The valley was popularized in the 1962 movie Shoot Out at Big Sag, starring Walter Brennan.

== Geography ==
Highwood is located in southwestern Chouteau County. It is in the valley of the northwest flowing Highwood Creek, a tributary of the Missouri River, and Big Sag Creek. It is 29 miles (47 km) east of Great Falls and just northwest of the Highwood Mountains.

According to the United States Census Bureau, the CDP has a total area of 4.5 square miles (11.6 km^{2}), all land.

== Climate ==
According to the Köppen Climate Classification system, Highwood has a warm-summer humid continental climate, abbreviated "Dfb" on climate maps.

Climate data for Highwood, Montana, 1991–2020 normals
Month	Jan	Feb	Mar	Apr	May	Jun	Jul	Aug	Sep	Oct	Nov	Dec	Year
Mean daily maximum °F (°C)	36.5 (2.5)	37.2 (2.9)	47.2 (8.4)	57.7 (14.3)	66.1 (18.9)	74.6 (23.7)	85.2 (29.6)	84.2 (29.0)	73.2 (22.9)	58.4 (14.7)	45.7 (7.6)	36.2 (2.3)	58.5 (14.7)
Daily mean °F (°C)	26.9 (−2.8)	27.4 (−2.6)	36.1 (2.3)	45.3 (7.4)	54.1 (12.3)	61.8 (16.6)	70.0 (21.1)	69.4 (20.8)	59.6 (15.3)	46.8 (8.2)	35.9 (2.2)	27.3 (−2.6)	46.7 (8.2)
Mean daily minimum °F (°C)	17.2 (−8.2)	17.5 (−8.1)	24.9 (−3.9)	32.9 (0.5)	42.0 (5.6)	48.9 (9.4)	54.8 (12.7)	54.5 (12.5)	45.9 (7.7)	35.2 (1.8)	26.1 (−3.3)	18.3 (−7.6)	34.9 (1.6)
Average precipitation inches (mm)	0.58 (15)	0.46 (12)	0.56 (14)	1.48 (38)	2.50 (64)	3.04 (77)	1.68 (43)	1.20 (30)	1.47 (37)	1.00 (25)	0.64 (16)	0.50 (13)	15.11 (384)
Average precipitation days (≥ 0.01 in)	4.5	5.0	4.2	6.0	7.2	9.1	5.0	4.6	4.7	3.8	3.2	3.1	60.4
Source 1: NOAA
Source 2: National Weather Service

== Demographics ==
Historical population
Census	Pop.	Note	%±
2020	165		—
U.S. Decennial Census

As of the census of 2000, there were 189 people, 66 households, and 50 families residing in the CDP. The population density was 42.2 inhabitants per square mile (16.3/km^{2}). There were 73 housing units at an average density of 16.3 per square mile (6.3/km^{2}). The racial makeup of the CDP was 97.35% White, 0.53% African American, 0.53% Asian, and 1.59% from two or more races. Hispanic or Latino of any race were 0.53% of the population.

There were 66 households, out of which 45.5% had children under the age of 18 living with them, 65.2% were married couples living together, 9.1% had a female householder with no husband present, and 24.2% were non-families. 16.7% of all households were made up of individuals, and 7.6% had someone living alone who was 65 years of age or older. The average household size was 2.86 and the average family size was 3.36.

In the CDP, the population was spread out, with 31.7% under the age of 18, 4.8% from 18 to 24, 28.6% from 25 to 44, 22.2% from 45 to 64, and 12.7% who were 65 years of age or older. The median age was 37 years. For every 100 females, there were 105.4 males. For every 100 females age 18 and over, there were 92.5 males.

The median income for a household in the CDP was $44,375, and the median income for a family was $44,375. Males had a median income of $24,375 versus $22,857 for females. The per capita income for the CDP was $14,457. About 11.5% of families and 8.8% of the population were below the poverty line, including 12.7% of those under the age of eighteen and 10.7% of those 65 or over.

== Education ==
Highwood Public Schools educates students from kindergarten through 12th grade. They are known as the Highwood Mountaineers. Highwood High School is a Class C school (fewer than 119 students) which helps determine athletic competitions. Enrollment for the 2022-2023 school year was at 117 students.
