= Manlius, Illinois =

- Village
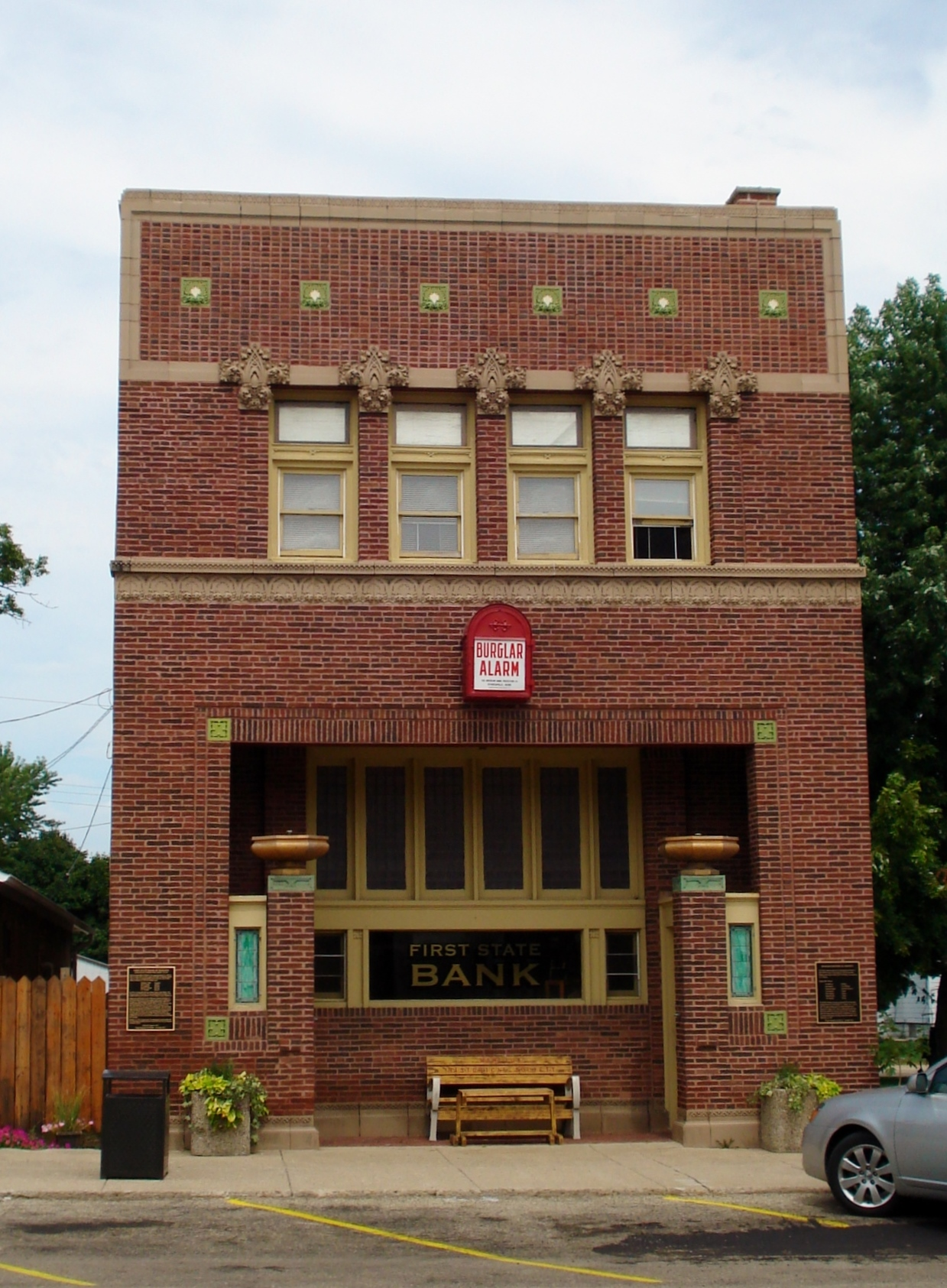
- First State Bank of Manlius

- Location of Manlius in Bureau County, Illinois.
- Coordinates: 41°27′20″N 89°40′09″W
- Country: United States
- State: Illinois
- County: Bureau
- Township: Manlius

Area
  - Total: 0.32 sq mi (0.83 km^{2})
  - Land: 0.32 sq mi (0.83 km^{2})
  - Water: 0 sq mi (0.00 km^{2})
- Elevation: 699 ft (213 m)

Population (2020)
  - Total: 298
  - Density: 934.5/sq mi (360.83/km^{2})
- Time zone: UTC-6 (CST)
  - Summer (DST): UTC-5 (CDT)
- ZIP code: 61338
- Area codes: 815 & 779
- FIPS code: 17-46422
- GNIS feature ID: 2399243

Manlius is a village in Bureau County, Illinois, United States. As of the 2020 census, Manlius had a population of 298. It is part of the Ottawa Micropolitan Statistical Area.

== History ==
A post office called Manlius has been in operation since 1871. The village was named after Manlius, New York.

== Geography ==
According to the 2021 census gazetteer files, Manlius has a total area of 0.32 square miles (0.83 km^{2}), all land.

== Demographics ==
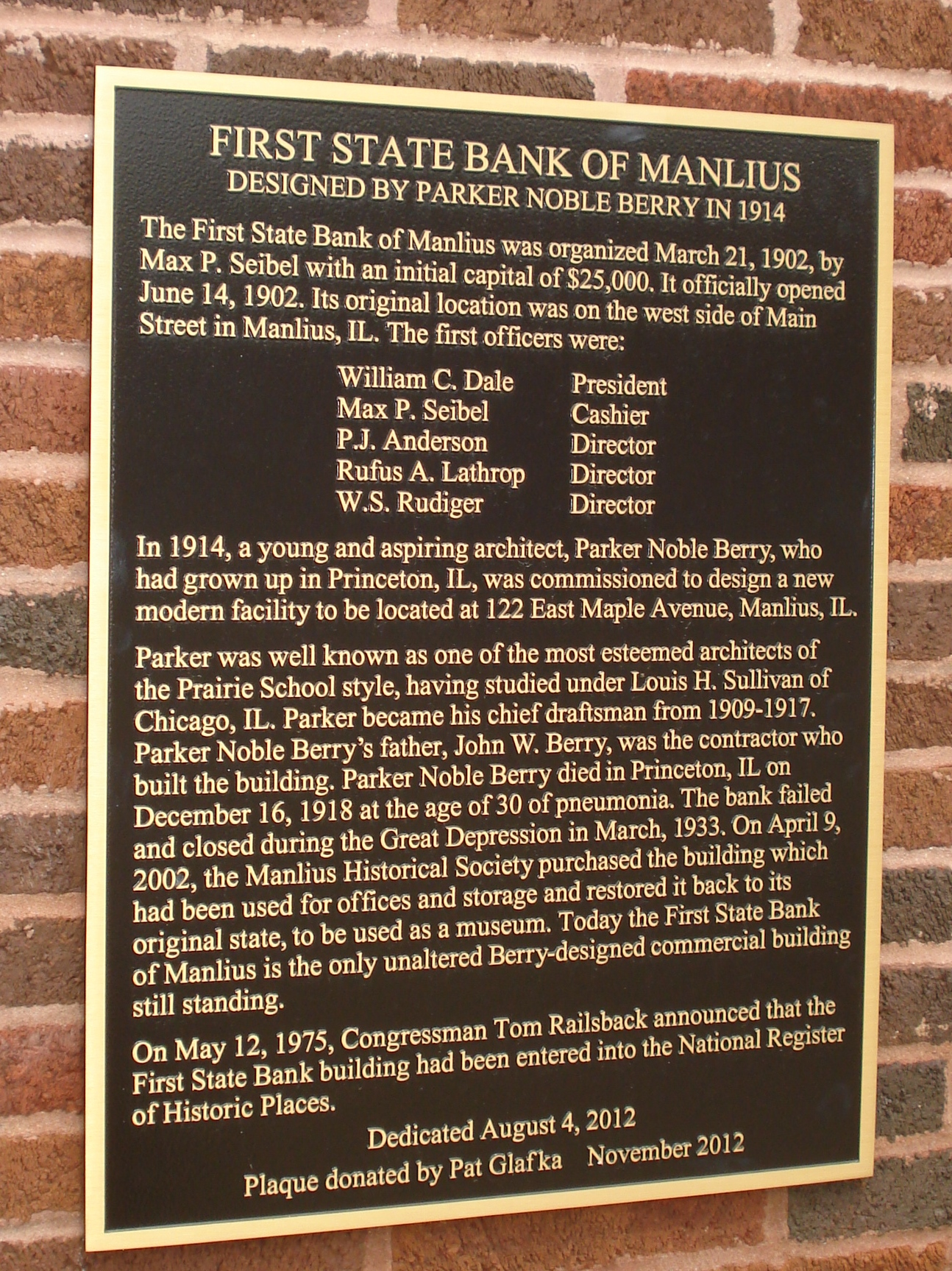
Plaque on First State Bank of Manlius

Historical population
Census	Pop.	Note	%±
1910	218		—
1920	309		41.7%
1930	299		−3.2%
1940	319		6.7%
1950	368		15.4%
1960	374		1.6%
1970	402		7.5%
1980	439		9.2%
1990	365		−16.9%
2000	355		−2.7%
2010	359		1.1%
2020	298		−17.0%
U.S. Decennial Census

As of the 2020 census there were 298 people, 131 households, and 81 families residing in the village. The population density was 934.17 inhabitants per square mile (360.69/km^{2}). There were 164 housing units at an average density of 514.11 per square mile (198.50/km^{2}). The racial makeup of the village was 93.29% White, 0.34% Asian, 0.34% from other races, and 6.04% from two or more races. Hispanic or Latino of any race were 2.01% of the population.

There were 131 households, out of which 26.7% had children under the age of 18 living with them, 39.69% were married couples living together, 12.21% had a female householder with no husband present, and 38.17% were non-families. 35.88% of all households were made up of individuals, and 16.79% had someone living alone who was 65 years of age or older. The average household size was 2.51 and the average family size was 2.09.

The village's age distribution consisted of 16.8% under the age of 18, 8.4% from 18 to 24, 23.3% from 25 to 44, 31.1% from 45 to 64, and 20.4% who were 65 years of age or older. The median age was 45.8 years. For every 100 females, there were 128.3 males. For every 100 females age 18 and over, there were 119.2 males.

The median income for a household in the village was $47,321, and the median income for a family was $55,417. Males had a median income of $35,000 versus $32,917 for females. The per capita income for the village was $27,987. About 3.7% of families and 8.9% of the population were below the poverty line, including 14.3% of those under age 18 and none of those age 65 or over.

== Education ==
It is in the Bureau Valley Community Unit School District 340.

== Notable people ==
- Jerry Hadley, opera singer
