= Loma, Montana =

- Census-designated place
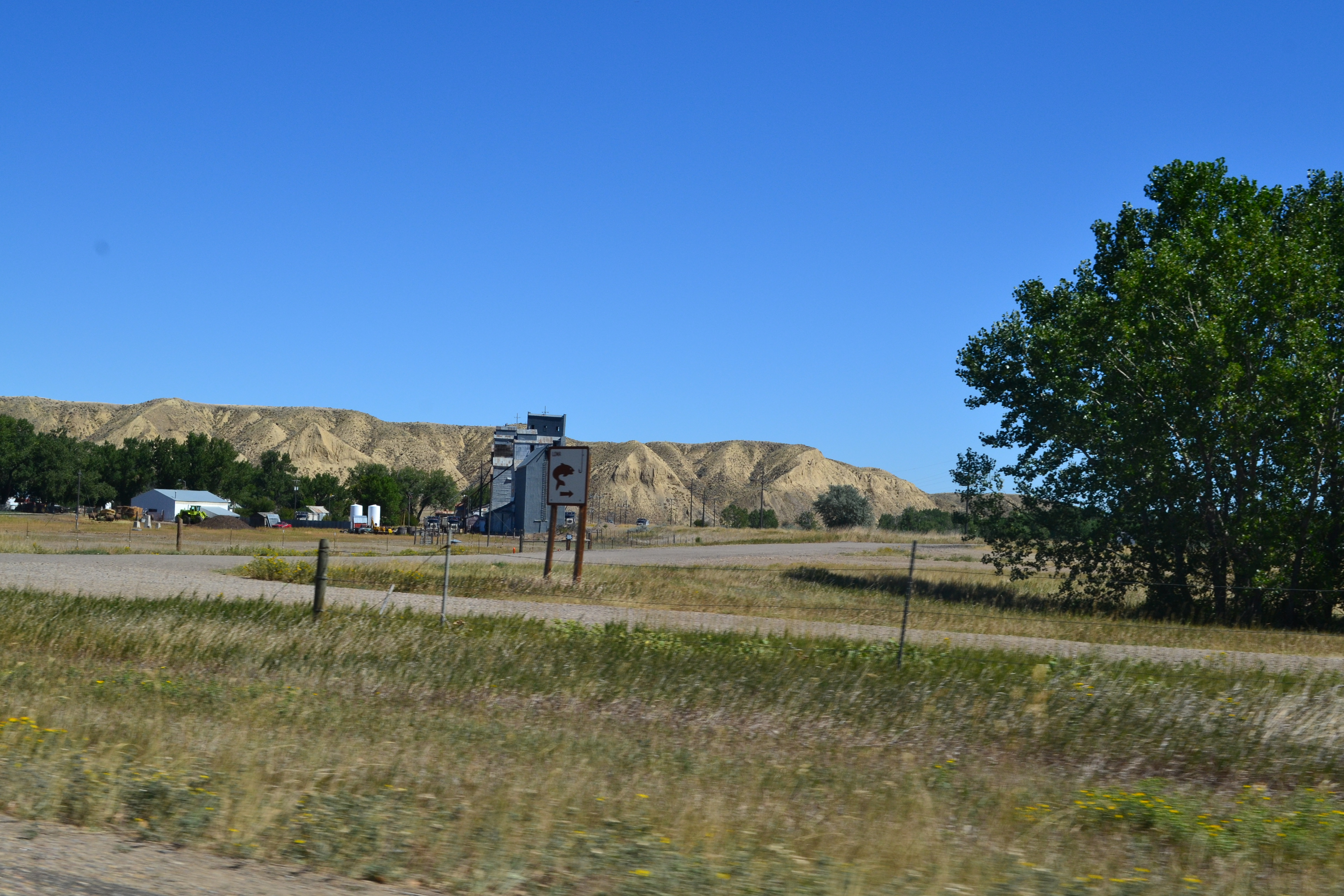
- Loma, Montana

- Location of Loma, Montana
- Coordinates: 47°56′54″N 110°29′50″W
- Country: United States
- State: Montana
- County: Chouteau

Area
  - Total: 3.44 sq mi (8.92 km^{2})
  - Land: 3.44 sq mi (8.92 km^{2})
  - Water: 0 sq mi (0.00 km^{2})
- Elevation: 2,743 ft (836 m)

Population (2020)
  - Total: 65
  - Density: 18.9/sq mi (7.29/km^{2})
- Time zone: UTC-7 (Mountain (MST))
  - Summer (DST): UTC-6 (MDT)
- ZIP code: 59460
- Area code: 406
- FIPS code: 30-44800
- GNIS feature ID: 2408119

Loma is a census-designated place (CDP) in Chouteau County, Montana, United States. As of the 2020 census, Loma had a population of 65.

== History ==
James Kipp, of the American Fur Company, founded the first community here in 1831. The Blackfeet laid siege to the fort, and the inhabitants quickly abandoned the site. The next year, the American Fur Company established another trading post, Fort McKenzie, a few miles upstream of the old site. During the 1860s, businessmen built a townsite called Ophir near the confluence of the Marias and the Missouri rivers. On May 25, 1865, the Blackfeet killed 10 men in the developing town.

== Geography and climate ==
Loma is located in central Chouteau County at the confluence of the Marias and Missouri rivers. U.S. Route 87 passes through the community, leading southwest 10 miles (16 km) to Fort Benton, the Chouteau County seat, and northeast 60 miles (97 km) to Havre.

According to the United States Census Bureau, the CDP has a total area of 3.42 square miles (8.86 km^{2}), all land.

The Loma area's dry climate supports natural vegetation with low shrubs and grass. Trees, mostly cottonwood, grow on developed land and in floodplains.

=== World record temperature change ===
Loma is the location of the most extreme temperature change in a 24-hour period ever recorded in the world. On January 15, 1972, the temperature rose from −54 °F (−47.8 °C) to 49 °F (9.4 °C), an extreme example of the regional Chinook wind in action.

Climate data for Loma, Montana, 1991–2020 normals, extremes 1950–present
Month	Jan	Feb	Mar	Apr	May	Jun	Jul	Aug	Sep	Oct	Nov	Dec	Year
Record high °F (°C)	72 (22)	76 (24)	84 (29)	95 (35)	100 (38)	107 (42)	108 (42)	111 (44)	104 (40)	94 (34)	80 (27)	71 (22)	111 (44)
Mean maximum °F (°C)	59.4 (15.2)	60.9 (16.1)	70.8 (21.6)	80.0 (26.7)	86.6 (30.3)	93.6 (34.2)	101.0 (38.3)	100.4 (38.0)	94.6 (34.8)	83.8 (28.8)	68.9 (20.5)	59.3 (15.2)	102.3 (39.1)
Mean daily maximum °F (°C)	34.1 (1.2)	38.3 (3.5)	48.7 (9.3)	59.4 (15.2)	69.0 (20.6)	77.2 (25.1)	87.6 (30.9)	86.5 (30.3)	75.6 (24.2)	60.7 (15.9)	46.2 (7.9)	36.3 (2.4)	60.0 (15.6)
Daily mean °F (°C)	20.6 (−6.3)	24.3 (−4.3)	34.1 (1.2)	44.6 (7.0)	54.1 (12.3)	62.4 (16.9)	70.1 (21.2)	68.5 (20.3)	58.4 (14.7)	45.1 (7.3)	32.4 (0.2)	22.9 (−5.1)	44.8 (7.1)
Mean daily minimum °F (°C)	7.2 (−13.8)	10.2 (−12.1)	19.5 (−6.9)	29.9 (−1.2)	39.2 (4.0)	47.6 (8.7)	52.7 (11.5)	50.5 (10.3)	41.2 (5.1)	29.5 (−1.4)	18.7 (−7.4)	9.5 (−12.5)	29.6 (−1.3)
Mean minimum °F (°C)	−23.8 (−31.0)	−17.0 (−27.2)	−2.8 (−19.3)	14.4 (−9.8)	25.7 (−3.5)	36.6 (2.6)	42.1 (5.6)	38.1 (3.4)	27.5 (−2.5)	10.7 (−11.8)	−5.9 (−21.1)	−16.0 (−26.7)	−31.9 (−35.5)
Record low °F (°C)	−54 (−48)	−50 (−46)	−38 (−39)	−12 (−24)	13 (−11)	28 (−2)	36 (2)	30 (−1)	15 (−9)	−17 (−27)	−33 (−36)	−54 (−48)	−54 (−48)
Average precipitation inches (mm)	0.53 (13)	0.37 (9.4)	0.50 (13)	1.37 (35)	2.01 (51)	2.53 (64)	1.19 (30)	1.17 (30)	1.12 (28)	0.99 (25)	0.61 (15)	0.40 (10)	12.79 (325)
Average snowfall inches (cm)	8.4 (21)	5.4 (14)	5.0 (13)	1.9 (4.8)	0.8 (2.0)	0.0 (0.0)	0.0 (0.0)	0.0 (0.0)	0.0 (0.0)	1.6 (4.1)	6.1 (15)	7.1 (18)	36.3 (92)
Average precipitation days (≥ 0.01 in)	5.3	5.2	5.0	7.7	9.5	10.2	6.3	5.4	5.4	5.7	5.2	5.1	76.0
Average snowy days (≥ 0.1 in)	4.3	4.2	2.5	0.8	0.3	0.0	0.0	0.0	0.0	0.7	2.7	4.1	19.6
Source 1: NOAA
Source 2: National Weather Service

== Demographics ==
Historical population
Census	Pop.	Note	%±
2000	92		—
2010	85		−7.6%
2020	65		−23.5%
U.S. Decennial Census

As of the 2000 census, 92 people, 40 households, and 25 families reside in the CDP. The population density was 26.6 inhabitants per square mile (10.3/km^{2}). There were 47 housing units at an average density of 13.6 per square mile (5.3/km^{2}). The racial makeup of the CDP was 97.83% White and 2.17% Native American.

There were 40 households, out of which 32.5% had children under the age of 18 living with them, 47.5% were married couples living together, 7.5% had a female householder with no husband present, and 37.5% were non-families. 37.5% of all households comprised individuals, and 15.0% had someone 65 years or older living alone. The average household size was 2.30, and the average family size was 3.00.

In the CDP, the population was spread out, with 28.3% under the age of 18, 8.7% from 18 to 24, 27.2% from 25 to 44, 23.9% from 45 to 64, and 12.0% who were 65 years of age or older. The median age was 39 years. For every 100 females, there were 109.1 males. For every 100 females age 18 and over, there were 106.3 males.

The median income for a household in the CDP was $25,208, and the median income for a family was $26,875. Males had a median income of $18,750 versus $11,250 for females. The per capita income for the CDP was $12,885. There were 13.0% of families and 17.1% of the population living below the poverty line, including no under eighteens and 27.8% of those over 64.

== See also ==
- List of census-designated places in Montana
