= Fort Benton Engine House =

- U.S. National Register of Historic Places
- U.S. National Historic Landmark District – Contributing property
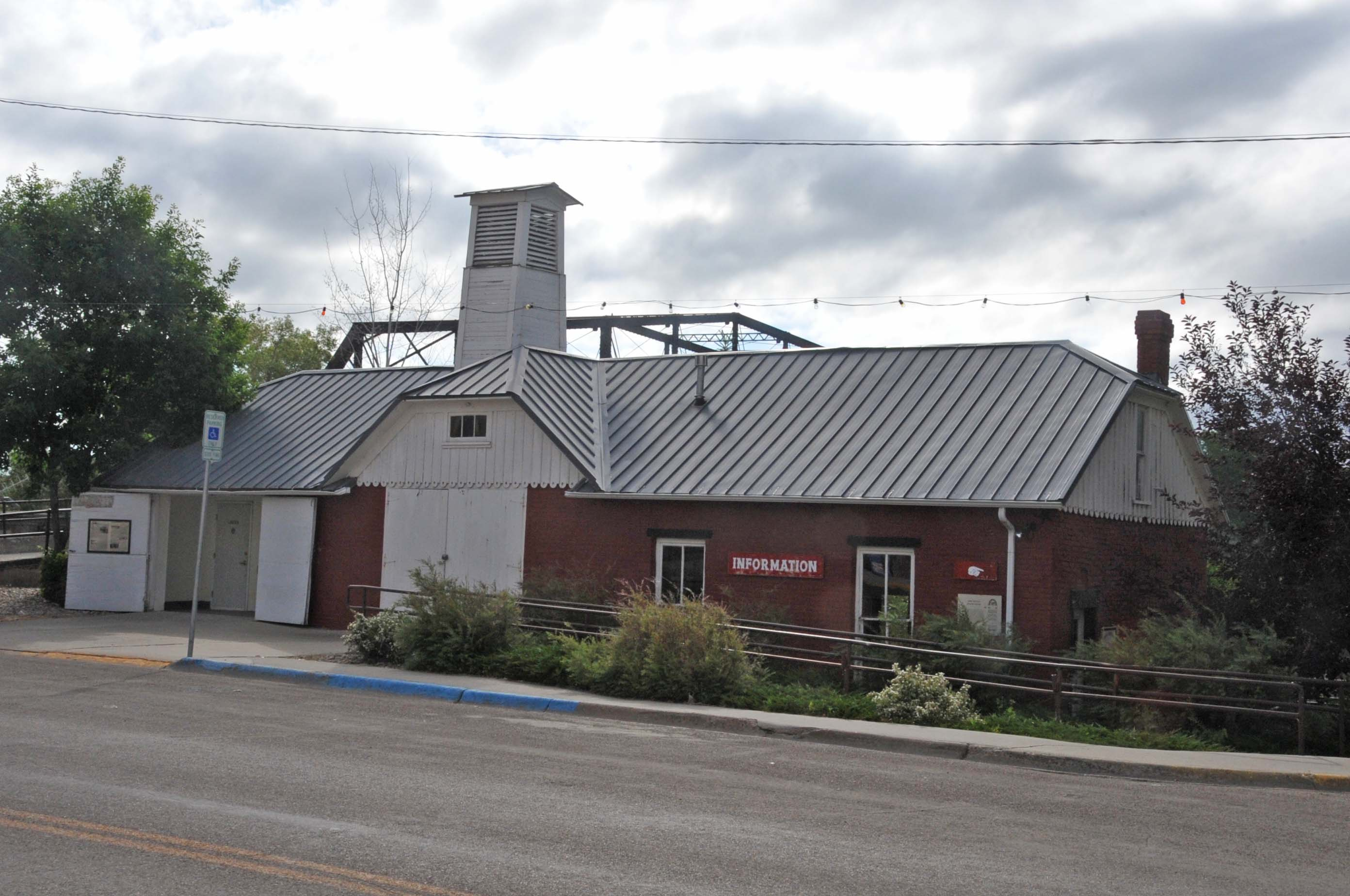

- Location within Montana Location within the United States
- Location: Front and 15th Sts., Fort Benton, Montana
- Coordinates: 47°49′02″N 110°39′38″W
- Area: 0.2 acres (0.081 ha)
- Built: 1883
- Built by: John Wilton
- Part of: Fort Benton Historic District (ID66000431)
- NRHP reference No.: 80002407

Significant dates
- Added to NRHP: November 20, 1980
- Designated NHLDCP: November 5, 1961

The Fort Benton Engine House, on Front and 15th Sts. in Fort Benton, Montana, was built in 1883. It has also been known as Old City Hall, because it served as city hall for the town for many years. It was listed on the National Register of Historic Places in 1980.

It is a one-and-a-half-story brick building, 22 by 60 feet (6.7 m × 18.3 m) in plan, which was built as a fire station but also served as city hall and jail in its early years.

It is also included in the Fort Benton Historic District.
