= Geraldine station =

Railway station in Geraldine, United States of America

Geraldine
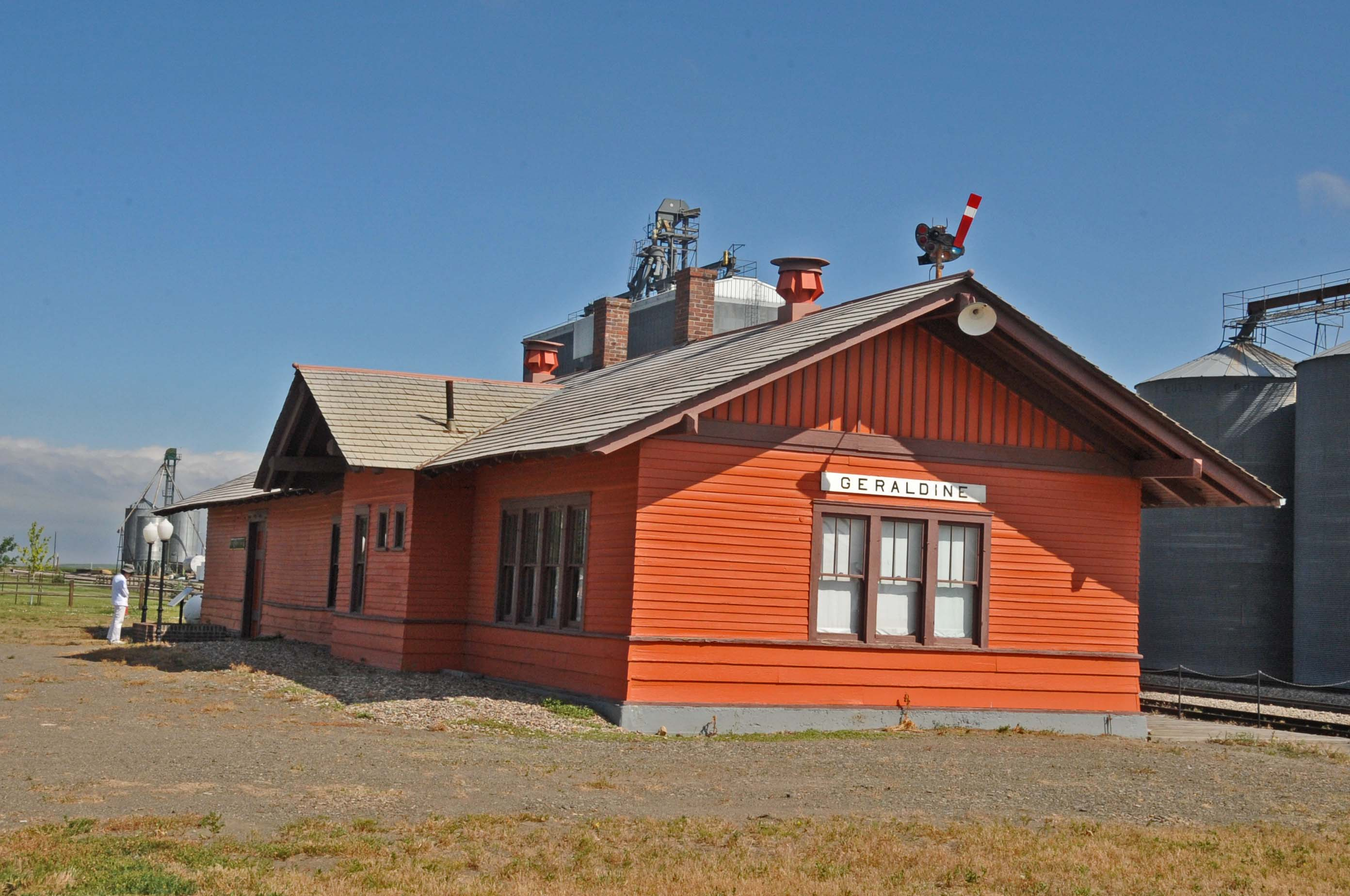
- Geraldine station in July 2013.

General information
- Location: 191 Railroad Avenue, Geraldine, Montana 59446
- System: Former Milwaukee Road passenger rail station

History
- Opened: 1914
- Closed: 1955

Services
Preceding station	Milwaukee Road	Following station
Montague toward Agawam	Northern Montana Division	Square Butte toward Harlowton
- Geraldine Milwaukee Depot
- U.S. National Register of Historic Places
- Location within Montana Location within the United States
- Location: Railroad Ave. Geraldine, Montana
- Coordinates: 47°36′14″N 110°15′55″W
- Built: 1914
- Architect: Chicago, Milwaukee and St. Paul Railway
- Architectural style: Craftsman
- NRHP reference No.: 97000254
- Added to NRHP: March 21, 1997
Location

The Geraldine Milwaukee Depot was built by the Chicago, Milwaukee and St. Paul Railway (otherwise known as The Milwaukee Road) in 1914. The depot is a rectangular one-story wood-frame building built in the Craftsman style.

After the completion of The Milwaukee Road's transcontinental extension across the northern tier of states from Chicago, Illinois to Tacoma, Washington on 1909, it began to build branch lines in order to bring in more business and open new markets. In 1913–14, The Milwaukee Road built the North Montana Line from Harlowton, Montana to Great Falls, Montana. New agricultural lands and settlements followed the branch line. Settlers homesteaded around Geraldine, a station named after the wife of railroad financier, William G. Rockefeller.

The depot at Geraldine served the local farms and daily freight and passenger trains stopped there. After World War II, rail traffic declined and passenger served ended in 1955. In 1980 The Milwaukee Road went bankrupt and ceased service to the Pacific Northwest. The North Montana Line was bought by the Burlington Northern Railroad. The rail line was closed due to a landslide in 1982. In 1985, Central Montana Rail bought the line and restored rail service. It sold the depot to the Geraldine Historical Committee in 1995.

The depot was listed in the National Register of Historic Places because of its architecture and its historical significance as one of the last Milwaukee Road depots along the North Montana Line.
