= Geraldine, Montana =

- Town
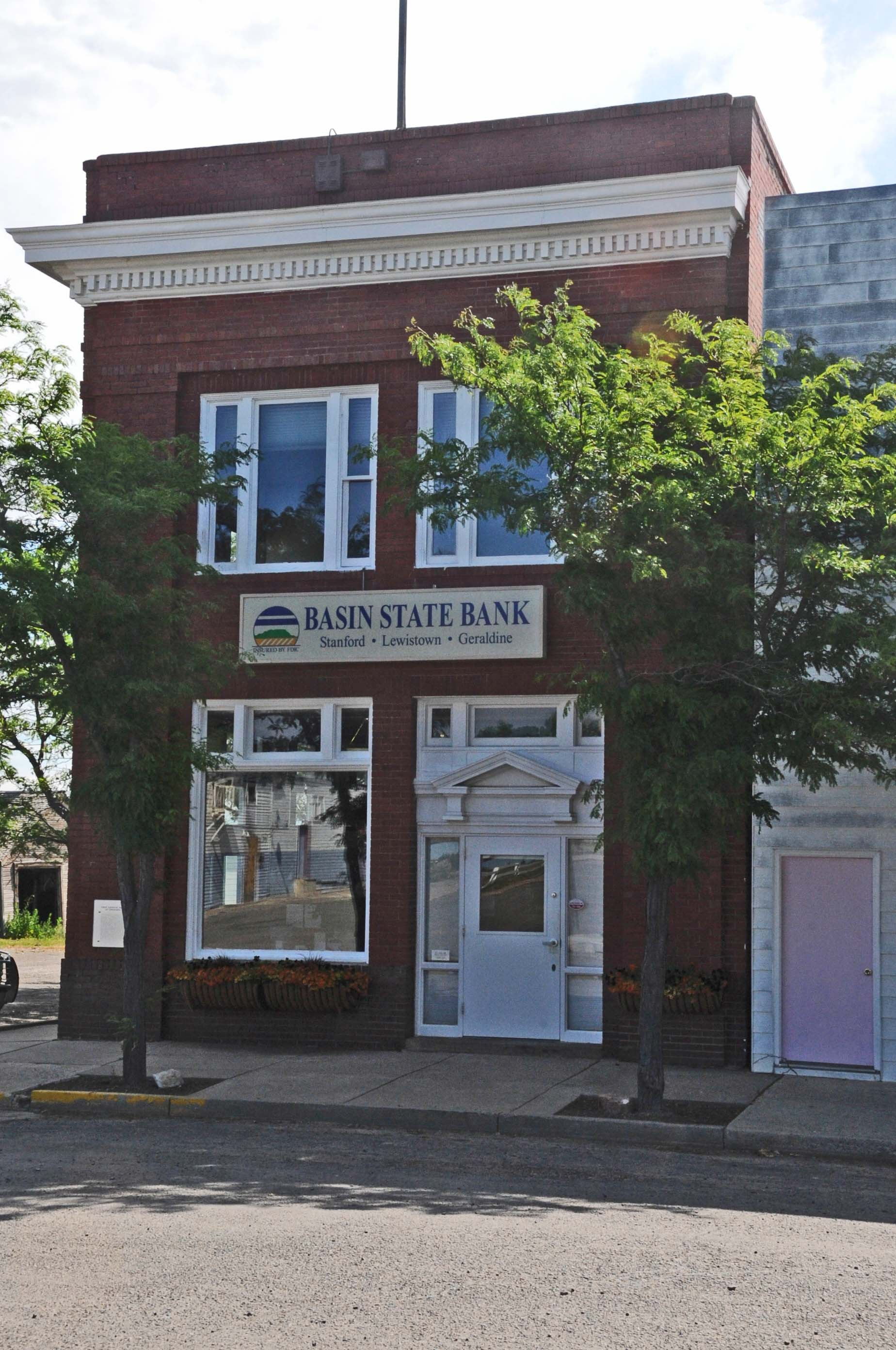
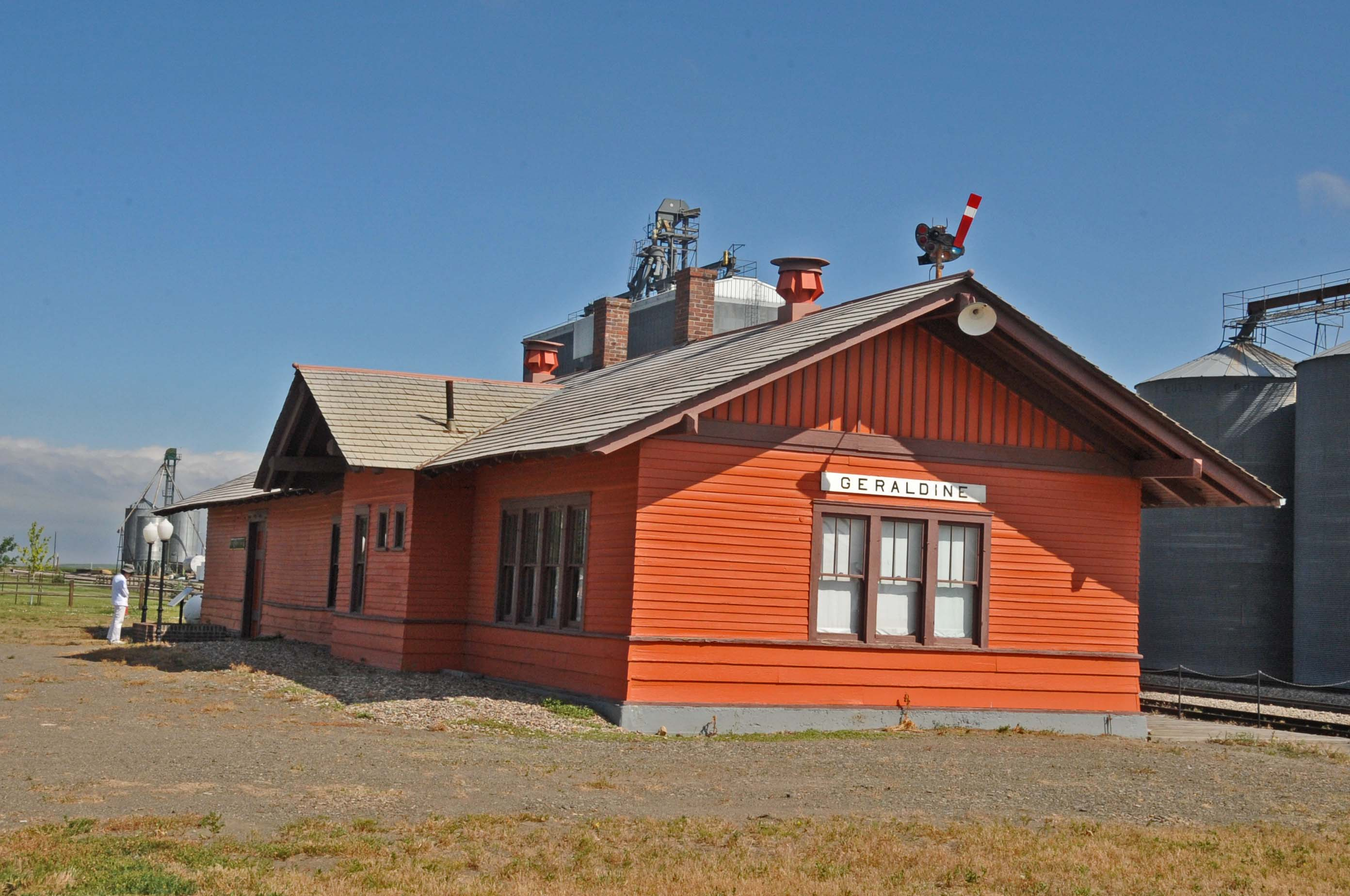
- First National Bank of Geraldine Geraldine Depot

- Location of Geraldine, Montana
- Coordinates: 47°36′08″N 110°15′58″W
- Country: United States
- State: Montana
- County: Chouteau

Area
  - Total: 0.58 sq mi (1.50 km^{2})
  - Land: 0.57 sq mi (1.48 km^{2})
  - Water: 0.0039 sq mi (0.01 km^{2})
- Elevation: 3,143 ft (958 m)

Population (2020)
  - Total: 207
  - Density: 361.0/sq mi (139.39/km^{2})
- Time zone: UTC-7 (Mountain (MST))
  - Summer (DST): UTC-6 (MDT)
- ZIP code: 59446
- Area code: 406
- FIPS code: 30-30400
- GNIS feature ID: 2412678

Geraldine is a town in Chouteau County, Montana, United States. The population was 207 at the 2020 census. The area around the town is an agricultural, largely wheat-producing, region.

== History ==
Geraldine was originally created as a stop on the Milwaukee Railroad. It was named for Almira Geraldine Rockefeller (or perhaps her daughter, Ethel Geraldine Rockefeller Dodge), the wife of William Rockefeller, the director of the railroad at the time.

The Milwaukee Road built a branch line from Harlowton to Great Falls in 1916. The town's wood-constructed railroad depot, also built in 1916, has been restored in recent years, now contains displays on the history of the area, and is a Montana Historic Site which is on the National Register of Historic Places. The Central Montana Rail runs a tourist train from Lewistown to Geraldine in the summer and passengers get to tour the restored depot.

== Geography ==
Montana Highway 80 cuts through town. It is near both Kingsbury Lake and Big Lake.

According to the United States Census Bureau, the town has a total area of 0.52 square miles (1.35 km^{2}), all land.

== Demographics ==
Historical population
Census	Pop.	Note	%±
1920	354		—
1930	279		−21.2%
1940	262		−6.1%
1950	374		42.7%
1960	364		−2.7%
1970	370		1.6%
1980	305		−17.6%
1990	299		−2.0%
2000	284		−5.0%
2010	261		−8.1%
2020	207		−20.7%
U.S. Decennial Census

=== 2010 census ===
As of the census of 2010, there were 261 people, 110 households, and 69 families residing in the town. The population density was 501.9 inhabitants per square mile (193.8/km^{2}). There were 140 housing units at an average density of 269.2 per square mile (103.9/km^{2}). The racial makeup of the town was 96.9% White, 0.4% Native American, 0.4% from other races, and 2.3% from two or more races. Hispanic or Latino of any race were 2.3% of the population.

There were 110 households, of which 31.8% had children under the age of 18 living with them, 45.5% were married couples living together, 10.0% had a female householder with no husband present, 7.3% had a male householder with no wife present, and 37.3% were non-families. 33.6% of all households were made up of individuals, and 18.2% had someone living alone who was 65 years of age or older. The average household size was 2.37 and the average family size was 3.06.

The median age in the town was 45.3 years. 29.9% of residents were under the age of 18; 4.2% were between the ages of 18 and 24; 15.2% were from 25 to 44; 30.7% were from 45 to 64; and 19.9% were 65 years of age or older. The gender makeup of the town was 47.1% male and 52.9% female.

=== 2000 census ===
As of the census of 2000, there were 284 people, 115 households, and 79 families residing in the town. The population density was 547.0 inhabitants per square mile (211.2/km^{2}). There were 141 housing units at an average density of 271.6 per square mile (104.9/km^{2}). The racial makeup of the town was 99.65% White, and 0.35% from two or more races. Hispanic or Latino of any race were 1.06% of the population.

There were 115 households, out of which 37.4% had children under the age of 18 living with them, 60.9% were married couples living together, 5.2% had a female householder with no husband present, and 31.3% were non-families. 29.6% of all households were made up of individuals, and 13.9% had someone living alone who was 65 years of age or older. The average household size was 2.47 and the average family size was 3.09.

In the town, the population was spread out, with 29.9% under the age of 18, 5.3% from 18 to 24, 25.7% from 25 to 44, 17.6% from 45 to 64, and 21.5% who were 65 years of age or older. The median age was 38 years. For every 100 females there were 97.2 males. For every 100 females age 18 and over, there were 97.0 males.

The median income for a household in the town was $30,893, and the median income for a family was $36,429. Males had a median income of $25,833 versus $16,250 for females. The per capita income for the town was $15,403. About 2.4% of families and 6.5% of the population were below the poverty line, including 10.2% of those under the age of eighteen and 4.4% of those 65 or over.

== Government ==
Geraldine has a mayor and town council. In November 2025 Kathy L. Bond was elected mayor.

== Education ==
Geraldine School District educates students from kindergarten through 12th grade. They are known as the Tigers. Geraldine High School is a Class C school.

Choteau County Library, headquartered in Fort Benton, has a branch in Geraldine.

== Infrastructure ==
Geraldine Airport is a public use airport. It is primarily used by agricultural spraying aircraft.
