= Fort Benton Bridge =

Bridge across the Missouri River in Fort Benton, Montana

- U.S. National Register of Historic Places
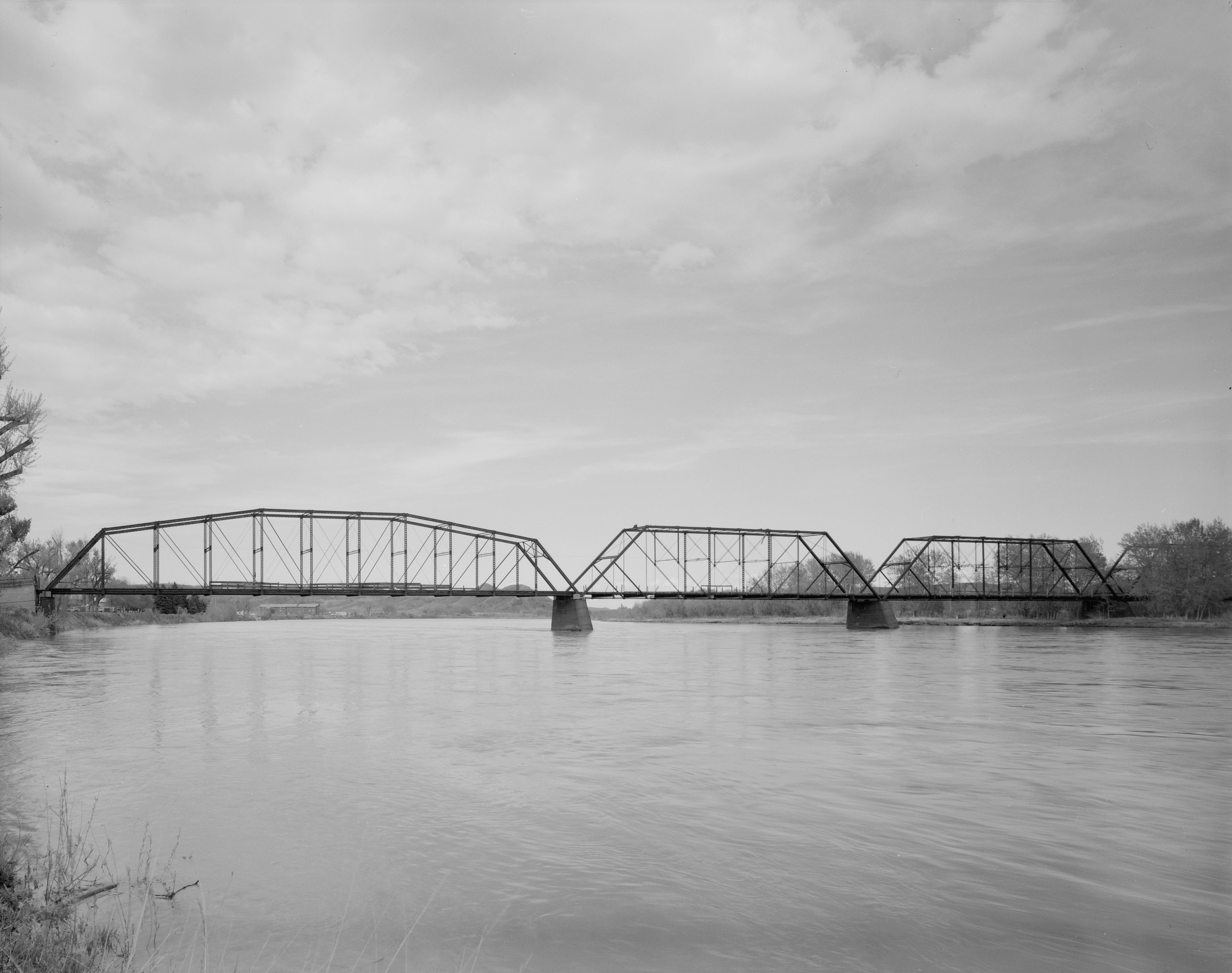

- Location within Montana Location within the United States
- Location: Spans Missouri River, Fort Benton, Montana
- Coordinates: 47°49′1″N 110°39′58″W
- Area: less than one acre
- Built: 1888
- Built by: Milwaukee Bridge & Iron Works; Ryane & Henry
- NRHP reference No.: 80002406
- Added to NRHP: August 6, 1980

Fort Benton Bridge spans the Missouri River at the town of Fort Benton, Montana. It was built in 1888. It has also been known as Old Bridge and was listed on the National Register of Historic Places in 1980.

The bridge has five pin-connected truss spans. The three center spans are Baltimore through trusses each 175 feet (53 m) long. The longer span on the Fort Benton bank is a 225 feet (69 m)-long Camelback through truss bridge built after a 1908 flood destroyed a cantilevered swing span and its central pier. The shortest span is a Pratt through truss which is 75 feet (23 m) long, on the far side from Fort Benton.

== See also ==
- List of bridges documented by the Historic American Engineering Record in Montana
