= Chouteau County, Montana =

County in Montana, United States

- County
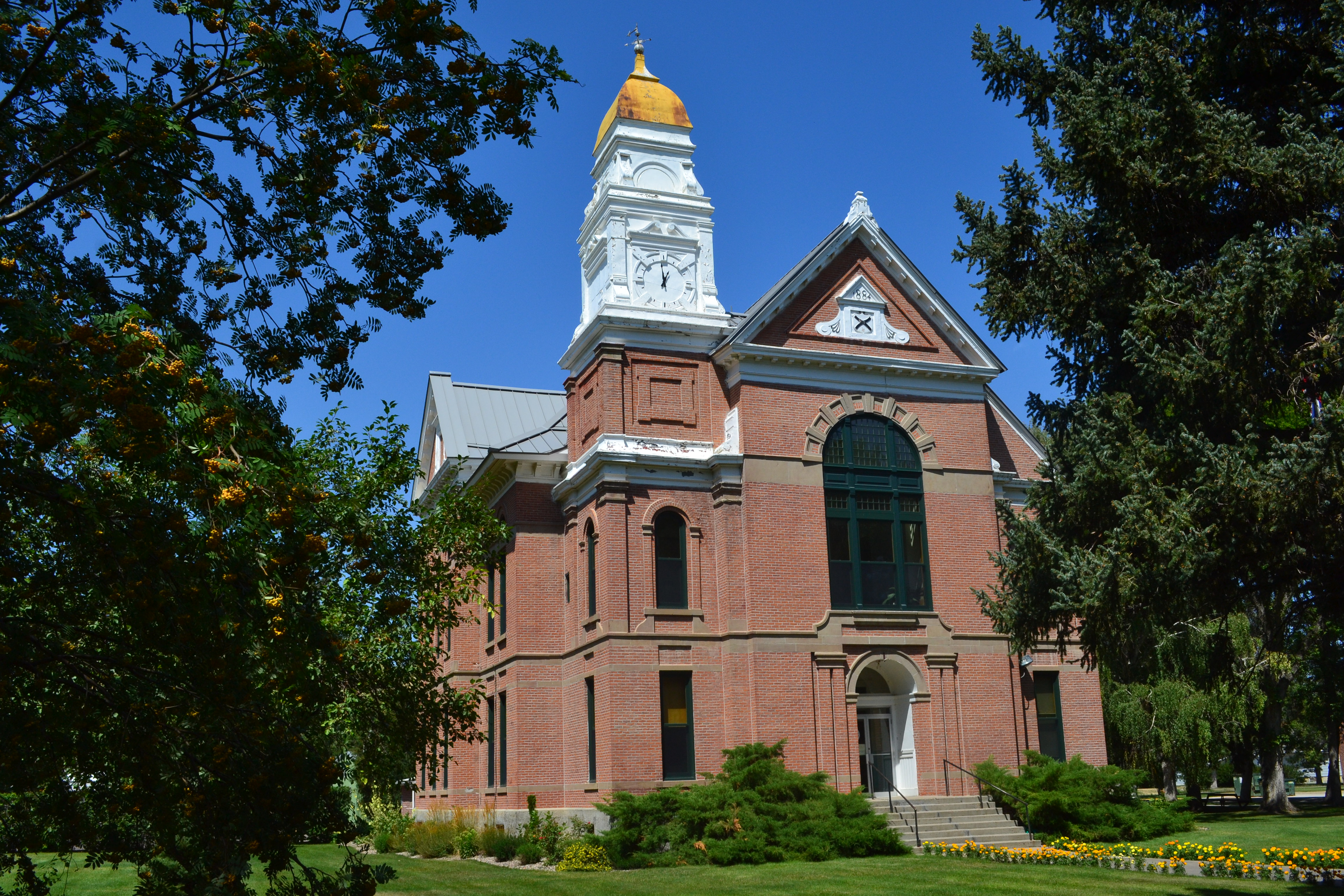
- Chouteau County Courthouse in Fort Benton

- Location within the U.S. state of Montana
- Coordinates: 47°53′N 110°26′W
- Country: United States
- State: Montana
- Founded: 1865
- Named for: Pierre Chouteau Jr.
- Seat: Fort Benton
- Largest city: Fort Benton

Area
  - Total: 3,997 sq mi (10,350 km^{2})
  - Land: 3,972 sq mi (10,290 km^{2})
  - Water: 24 sq mi (62 km^{2}) 0.6%

Population (2020)
  - Total: 5,895
  - Estimate (2025): 5,865 ▼
  - Density: 1.5/sq mi (0.58/km^{2})
- Time zone: UTC−7 (Mountain)
  - Summer (DST): UTC−6 (MDT)
- Congressional district: 2nd
- Website: www.chouteaucountymt.gov
- Montana county number 19

Chouteau County is a county located in the North-Central region of the U.S. state of Montana. As of the 2020 census, the population was 5,895. Its county seat is Fort Benton. The county was established in 1865 as one of the original nine counties of Montana, and named in 1882 after Pierre Chouteau Jr., a fur trader who established a trading post that became Fort Benton, which was once an important port on the Missouri River.

Chouteau County is home to the Chippewa-Cree tribe on the Rocky Boy Indian Reservation. It contains part of the Lewis and Clark National Forest.

== Geography ==
According to the United States Census Bureau, the county has a total area of 3,997 square miles (10,350 km^{2}), of which 3,972 square miles (10,290 km^{2}) is land and 24 square miles (62 km^{2}) (0.6%) is water.

Chouteau County was once the largest county in the Montana Territory and the second largest in the United States, with an area of 15,439 square miles (39,990 km^{2}) in the early 20th century. However, some parts of the county were over 250 miles (400 km) from the county seat in Fort Benton, so in 1893, the first of several partitions began with the creation of Teton County, the western portion of Chouteau County. In 1912 Blaine, Phillips and Hill counties were formed from northeastern portions of Chouteau County. The county lost half of its population from 1910 to 1930 mainly due to reduction in square miles.

The land is mostly rolling prairie, hence the high density of wheat farming. However, there is notable topography, namely some of Montana's forested island ranges. The Bear Paw Mountains rise in the northeast and the Little Rockies and the Highwood Ranges are in the southeast. Major rivers include the Teton River, Marias River, Missouri River and Arrow Creek.

=== Adjacent counties ===
- Liberty County – north
- Hill County – north
- Blaine County – east
- Fergus County – southeast
- Judith Basin County – south
- Cascade County – south
- Teton County – west
- Pondera County – northwest

=== Major highway ===
- U.S. Route 87

=== National protected areas ===
- Lewis and Clark National Forest (part)
- Upper Missouri River Breaks National Monument (part)

== Politics ==
Choteau County is heavily Republican, like many other rural Montana counties. The entirety of the county votes majority Republican except for the portion of the Rocky Boy's Reservation in the northeast, which is strongly Democratic. In no election since 1964 has a Democratic presidential candidate carried the county.

United States presidential election results for Chouteau County, Montana
| Year | Republican | | Democratic | | Third party(ies) | |
| Year | No. | % | No. | % | No. | % |
|---|---|---|---|---|---|---|
| 1904 | 1,517 | 70.62% | 568 | 26.44% | 63 | 2.93% |
| 1908 | 1,220 | 54.73% | 893 | 40.06% | 116 | 5.20% |
| 1912 | 561 | 41.43% | 402 | 29.69% | 391 | 28.88% |
| 1916 | 1,486 | 33.62% | 2,738 | 61.95% | 196 | 4.43% |
| 1920 | 2,646 | 60.86% | 1,436 | 33.03% | 266 | 6.12% |
| 1924 | 1,347 | 46.15% | 706 | 24.19% | 866 | 29.67% |
| 1928 | 1,837 | 59.14% | 1,232 | 39.67% | 37 | 1.19% |
| 1932 | 1,232 | 35.43% | 2,093 | 60.20% | 152 | 4.37% |
| 1936 | 878 | 24.01% | 2,734 | 74.76% | 45 | 1.23% |
| 1940 | 1,235 | 35.54% | 2,213 | 63.68% | 27 | 0.78% |
| 1944 | 1,220 | 38.69% | 1,906 | 60.45% | 27 | 0.86% |
| 1948 | 1,181 | 37.64% | 1,832 | 58.38% | 125 | 3.98% |
| 1952 | 2,098 | 59.35% | 1,423 | 40.25% | 14 | 0.40% |
| 1956 | 1,721 | 48.96% | 1,794 | 51.04% | 0 | 0.00% |
| 1960 | 1,672 | 49.34% | 1,708 | 50.40% | 9 | 0.27% |
| 1964 | 1,444 | 44.08% | 1,827 | 55.77% | 5 | 0.15% |
| 1968 | 1,695 | 53.66% | 1,216 | 38.49% | 248 | 7.85% |
| 1972 | 2,027 | 59.64% | 1,149 | 33.80% | 223 | 6.56% |
| 1976 | 1,814 | 52.35% | 1,568 | 45.25% | 83 | 2.40% |
| 1980 | 2,448 | 68.32% | 853 | 23.81% | 282 | 7.87% |
| 1984 | 2,425 | 72.17% | 896 | 26.67% | 39 | 1.16% |
| 1988 | 1,980 | 61.51% | 1,166 | 36.22% | 73 | 2.27% |
| 1992 | 1,380 | 42.65% | 959 | 29.64% | 897 | 27.72% |
| 1996 | 1,660 | 52.58% | 1,039 | 32.91% | 458 | 14.51% |
| 2000 | 2,039 | 70.68% | 686 | 23.78% | 160 | 5.55% |
| 2004 | 1,913 | 65.49% | 946 | 32.39% | 62 | 2.12% |
| 2008 | 1,634 | 57.11% | 1,122 | 39.22% | 105 | 3.67% |
| 2012 | 1,758 | 62.32% | 978 | 34.67% | 85 | 3.01% |
| 2016 | 1,679 | 64.50% | 732 | 28.12% | 192 | 7.38% |
| 2020 | 1,891 | 63.78% | 991 | 33.42% | 83 | 2.80% |
| 2024 | 1,885 | 64.25% | 940 | 32.04% | 109 | 3.72% |

== Demographics ==
Historical population
| Census | Pop. | Note | %± |
|---|---|---|---|
| 1870 | 517 | | — |
| 1880 | 3,068 | | 493.4% |
| 1890 | 4,741 | | 54.5% |
| 1900 | 10,966 | | 131.3% |
| 1910 | 17,191 | | 56.8% |
| 1920 | 11,051 | | −35.7% |
| 1930 | 8,635 | | −21.9% |
| 1940 | 7,316 | | −15.3% |
| 1950 | 6,974 | | −4.7% |
| 1960 | 7,348 | | 5.4% |
| 1970 | 6,473 | | −11.9% |
| 1980 | 6,092 | | −5.9% |
| 1990 | 5,452 | | −10.5% |
| 2000 | 5,970 | | 9.5% |
| 2010 | 5,813 | | −2.6% |
| 2020 | 5,895 | | 1.4% |
| 2025 (est.) | 5,865 | ▼ | −0.5% |
U.S. Decennial Census:

=== Census-designated places ===
The United States Census Bureau, for population data analyses of unorganized rural areas, the following Census-designated places, or CDPs, in addition to the organized communities listed elsewhere in this article.

- Boneau
- Carter
- Floweree
- Highwood
- Loma
- Parker School
- Rocky Boy West
- Square Butte
- Sunnybrook Colony
- Twin Hills Colony

=== 2020 census ===
As of the 2020 census, the county had a population of 5,895. Of the residents, 26.3% were under the age of 18 and 20.6% were 65 years of age or older; the median age was 40.3 years. For every 100 females there were 99.2 males, and for every 100 females age 18 and over there were 98.7 males. 0.0% of residents lived in urban areas and 100.0% lived in rural areas.

The racial makeup of the county was 71.5% White, 0.2% Black or African American, 23.9% American Indian and Alaska Native, 0.3% Asian, 0.5% from some other race, and 3.6% from two or more races. Hispanic or Latino residents of any race comprised 2.7% of the population.

There were 2,291 households in the county, of which 31.0% had children under the age of 18 living with them and 23.9% had a female householder with no spouse or partner present. About 29.2% of all households were made up of individuals and 15.0% had someone living alone who was 65 years of age or older.

There were 2,843 housing units, of which 19.4% were vacant. Among occupied housing units, 66.0% were owner-occupied and 34.0% were renter-occupied. The homeowner vacancy rate was 1.8% and the rental vacancy rate was 6.0%.

=== 2010 census ===
As of the 2010 census, there were 5,813 people, 2,294 households, and 1,560 families living in the county. The population density was 1.5 inhabitants per square mile (0.58/km^{2}). There were 2,879 housing units at an average density of 0.7 units per square mile (0.27 units/km^{2}). The racial makeup of the county was 75.8% white, 21.8% American Indian, 0.4% Asian, 0.1% Pacific islander, 0.1% black or African American, 0.3% from other races, and 1.6% from two or more races. Those of Hispanic or Latino origin made up 1.6% of the population. In terms of ancestry, 27.6% were German, 13.0% were Irish, 11.2% were English, 9.8% were Norwegian, and 2.0% were American.

Of the 2,294 households, 31.2% had children under the age of 18 living with them, 52.3% were married couples living together, 10.1% had a female householder with no husband present, 32.0% were non-families, and 29.1% of all households were made up of individuals. The average household size was 2.48 and the average family size was 3.04. The median age was 41.5 years.

The median income for a household in the county was $41,064 and the median income for a family was $50,201. Males had a median income of $33,866 versus $25,077 for females. The per capita income for the county was $20,202. About 14.8% of families and 21.0% of the population were below the poverty line, including 33.6% of those under age 18 and 6.2% of those age 65 or over.

== Economy ==
Chouteau County is the state's largest winter wheat producer. It is located in the heart of the "Golden Triangle", which produces about 45% of Montana's annual wheat crop.

== Communities ==
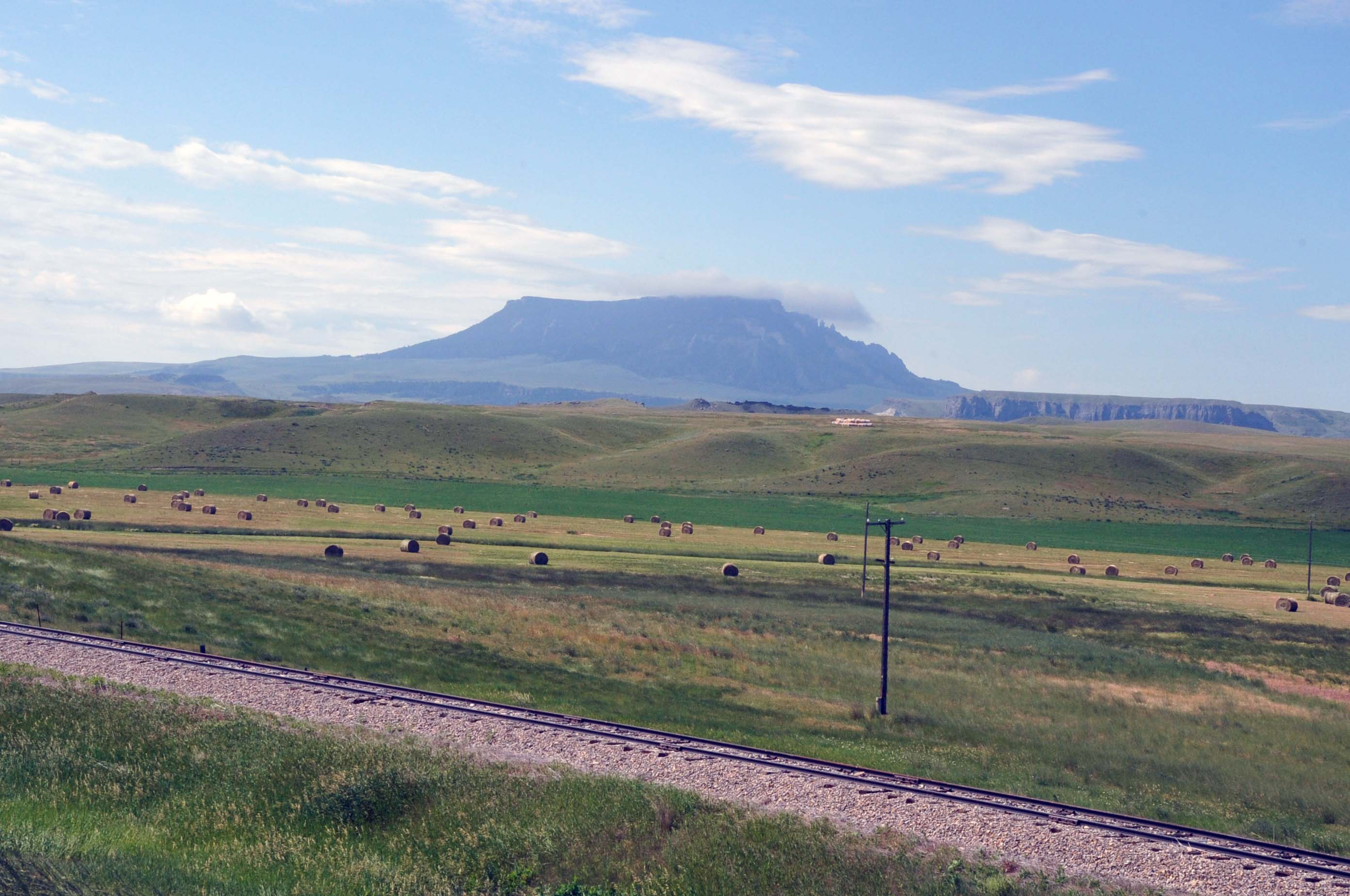
Square Butte

=== City ===
- Fort Benton (county seat)

=== Towns ===
- Big Sandy
- Geraldine

=== Census-designated places ===
- Boneau
- Carter
- Floweree
- Highwood
- Loma
- Parker School (partly in Hill County
- Rocky Boy West (partly in Hill County
- Square Butte
- Sunnybrook Colony
- Twin Hills Colony

=== Unincorporated communities ===
- Big Sag
- Coal Banks Landing
- Lippard
- Montague
- Shepherd Crossing
- Shonkin
- Stranahan
- Virgelle
- Warrick
- Woods Crossing

== See also ==
- List of lakes in Chouteau County, Montana
- List of mountains in Chouteau County, Montana
- National Register of Historic Places listings in Chouteau County, Montana
