= Manlius Township, Michigan =

- Township
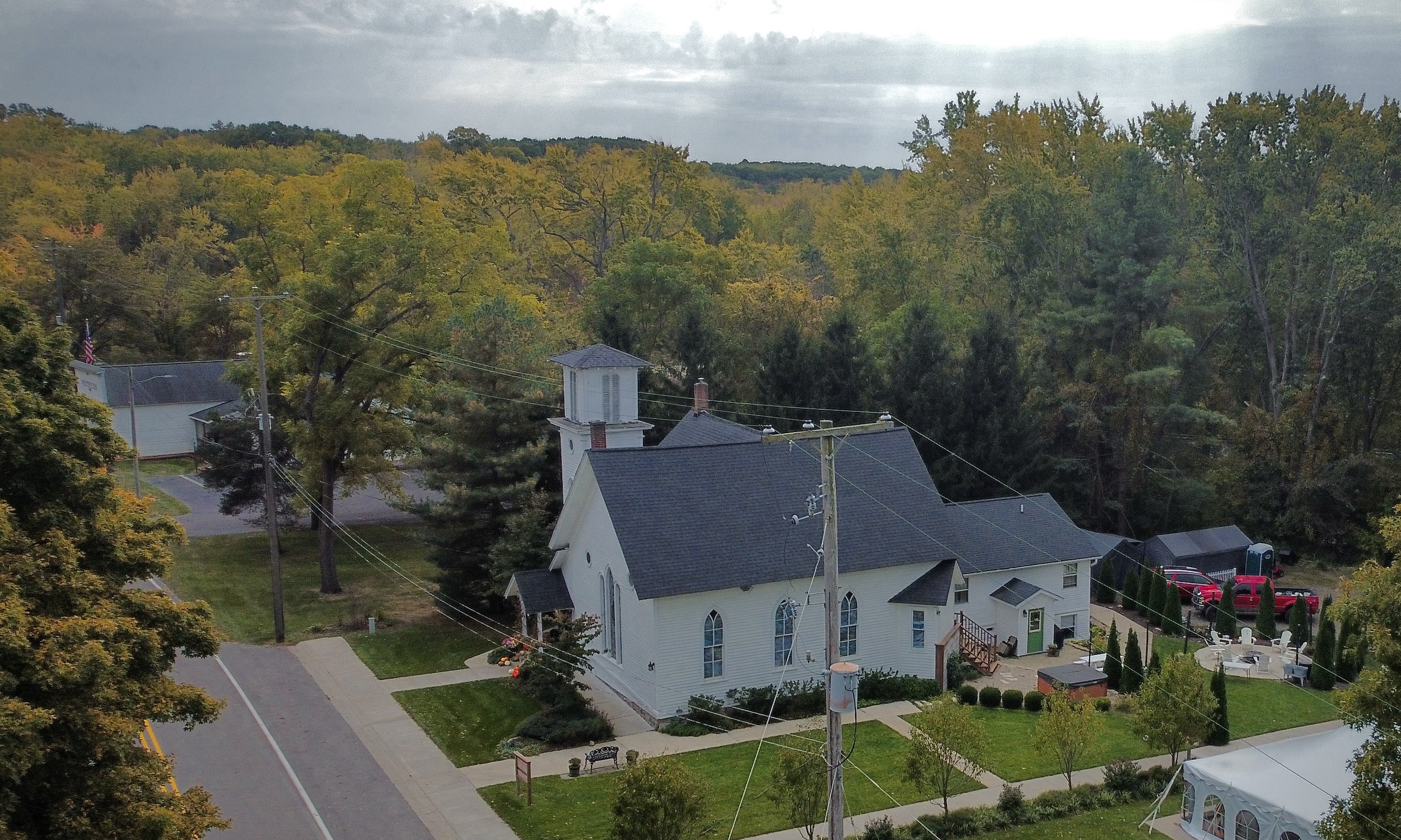
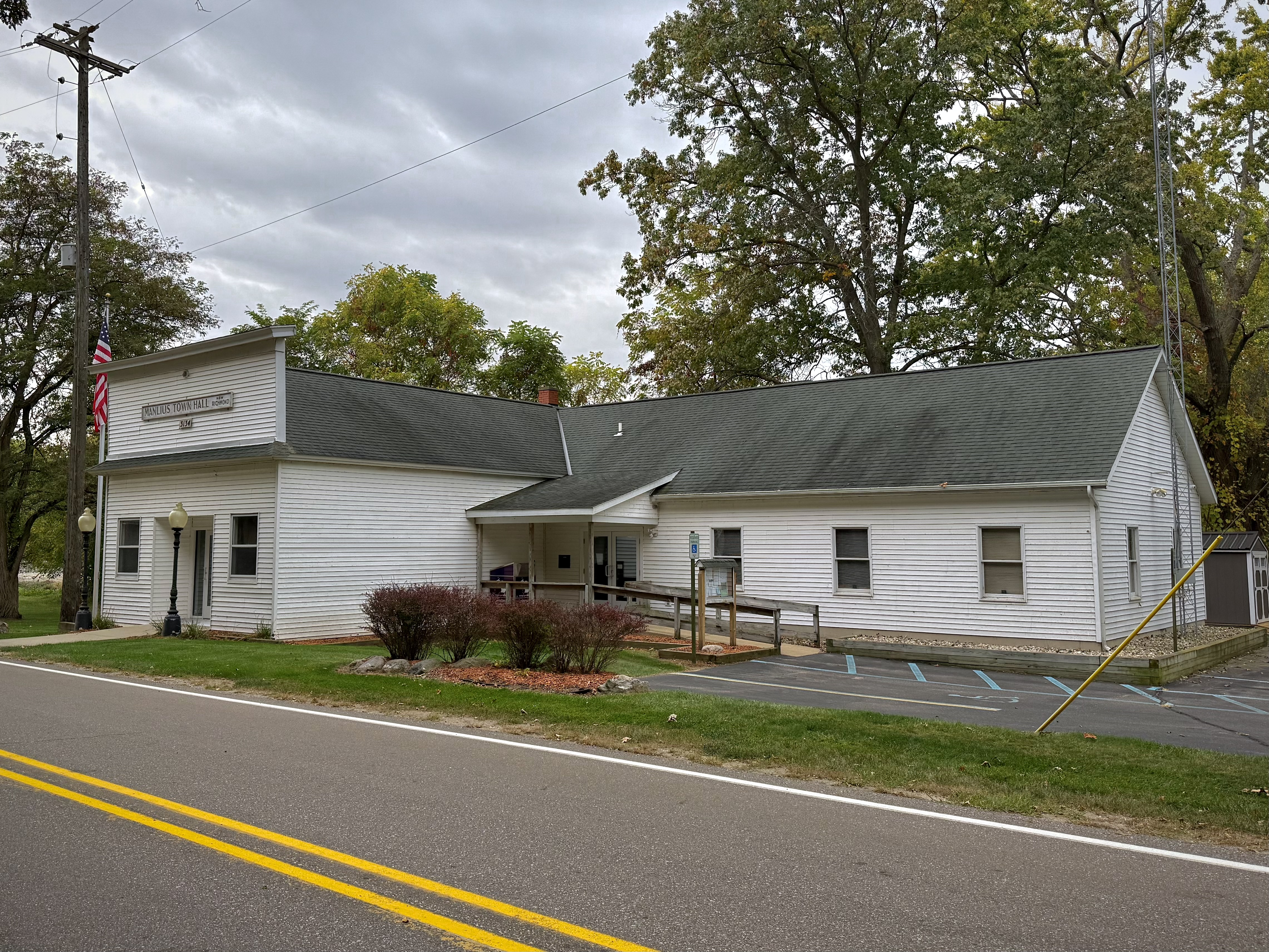
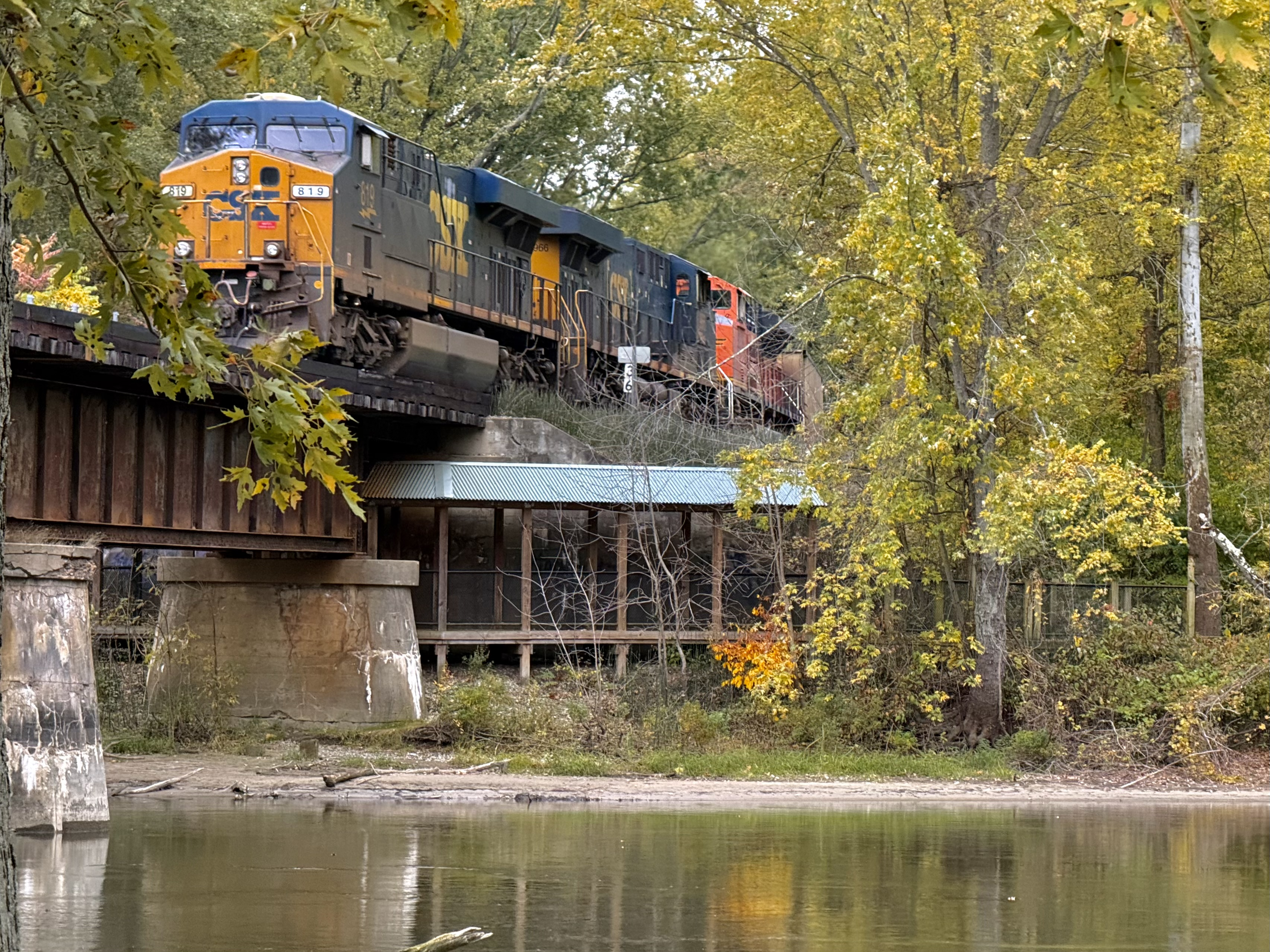
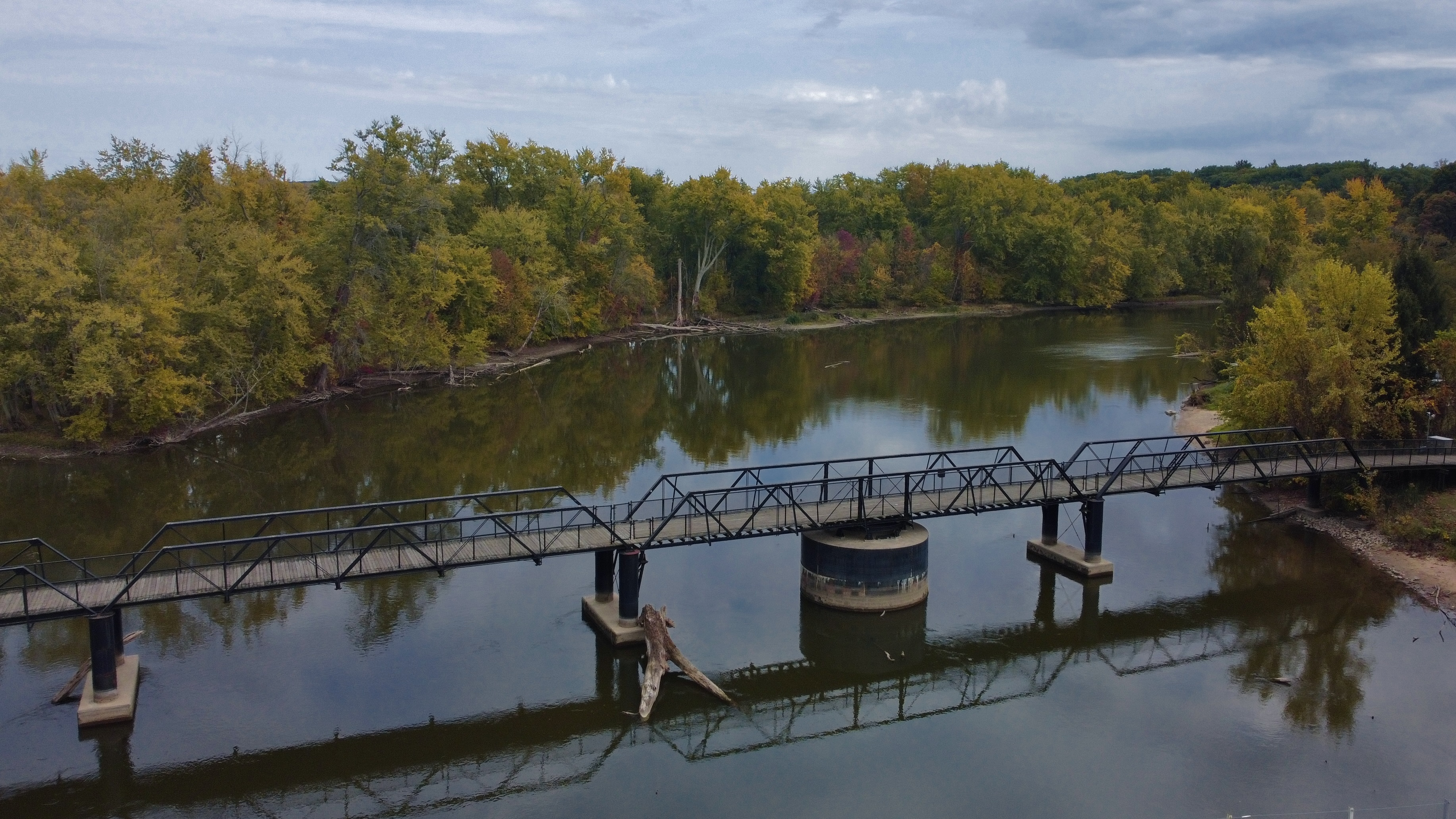
- Aerial image of Manlius Manlius Town Hall Railroad bridge New Richmond Swing Bridge

- Location within the state of Michigan
- Coordinates: 42°38′32″N 86°4′30″W
- Country: United States
- State: Michigan
- County: Allegan

Area
  - Total: 35.9 sq mi (93.1 km^{2})
  - Land: 35.2 sq mi (91.1 km^{2})
  - Water: 0.77 sq mi (2.0 km^{2})
- Elevation: 584 ft (178 m)

Population (2020)
  - Total: 3,312
  - Density: 94.1/sq mi (36.34/km^{2})
- Time zone: UTC-5 (Eastern (EST))
  - Summer (DST): UTC-4 (EDT)
- FIPS code: 26-50840
- GNIS feature ID: 1626670
- Website: www.manliustwp.org

Manlius Township is a civil township of Allegan County in the U.S. state of Michigan. The population was 3,312 at the 2020 census.

== History ==
A post to trade with the local Ottawa people was established by a man named Campau here in 1825. The township was established in 1839.

== Communities ==
The city of Fennville is at the southwest corner of the township, but is administratively autonomous.

=== New Richmond ===
New Richmond is an unincorporated community within the township at 42°38′52″N 86°06′20″W near where Old Allegan Road and the Chesapeake and Ohio Railway cross the Kalamazoo River. It is about a mile west of where the Rabbit River flows into the Kalamazoo. In 1836, three eastern investors, led by John Allen of Ann Arbor, arranged to found a city here. Allen platted the village of "Richmond", after his home town of Richmond, Virginia. The village was platted covering all of section 8 and the eastern half of section 7, just a bit north and west of the present location. Some land was cleared, a general store and some houses were built, and in November 1837, a post office opened named "Richmond". However, the office closed in October 1839, after Allen's business venture failed in 1838 due to financial depression following the Panic of 1837.

Ralph R. Mann, who had been hired by Allen to direct improvements at Richmond, in 1844 moved to a location to the south of the first site and built a water-powered sawmill on the river. This settlement became known as "Manlius", and a post office opened in July 1846. It is said to be named after Manlius, New York. It was for a while a station on the Chicago and West Michigan Railway, but was mostly abandoned in 1874 after the destruction of the mill's dam and the local tavern burned down. With the coming of the railroad, H. F. Marsh laid out a new village of Richmond near the older site, which prospered and after a time supplanted Manlius. In October 1872, the post office was closed in Manlius and another was established named "New Richmond". After a time, the settlement also came to be known as "New Richmond".

== Geography ==
According to the United States Census Bureau, the township has a total area of 35.9 square miles (93.1 km^{2}), of which 35.2 square miles (91.1 km^{2}) is land and 0.77 square miles (2.0 km^{2}), or 2.14%, is water.

== Demographics ==
Historical population
Census	Pop.	Note	%±
1960	1,429		—
1970	1,202		−15.9%
1980	1,458		21.3%
1990	1,776		21.8%
2000	2,634		48.3%
2010	3,017		14.5%
2020	3,312		9.8%
Source: Census Bureau. Census 1960- 2000, 2010.

As of the census of 2000, there were 2,634 people, 899 households, and 735 families residing in the township. The population density was 74.5 inhabitants per square mile (28.8/km^{2}). There were 948 housing units at an average density of 26.8 per square mile (10.3/km^{2}). The racial makeup of the township was 94.00% White, 0.57% African American, 0.53% Native American, 0.57% Asian, 0.23% Pacific Islander, 3.00% from other races, and 1.10% from two or more races. Hispanic or Latino of any race were 9.23% of the population.

There were 899 households, out of which 42.4% had children under the age of 18 living with them, 72.0% were married couples living together, 5.8% had a female householder with no husband present, and 18.2% were non-families. 15.2% of all households were made up of individuals, and 4.1% had someone living alone who was 65 years of age or older. The average household size was 2.93 and the average family size was 3.27.

In the township the population was spread out, with 31.2% under the age of 18, 6.2% from 18 to 24, 34.7% from 25 to 44, 20.8% from 45 to 64, and 7.1% who were 65 years of age or older. The median age was 34 years. For every 100 females, there were 106.3 males. For every 100 females age 18 and over, there were 106.3 males.

The median income for a household in the township was $51,653, and the median income for a family was $54,868. Males had a median income of $36,078 versus $27,333 for females. The per capita income for the township was $19,009. About 2.9% of families and 4.0% of the population were below the poverty line, including 5.3% of those under age 18 and 2.8% of those age 65 or over.
