= Carter, Montana =

- Census-designated place
- Location of Carter, Montana
- Coordinates: 47°46′52″N 110°56′24″W
- Country: United States
- State: Montana
- County: Chouteau

Area
  - Total: 2.90 sq mi (7.51 km^{2})
  - Land: 2.90 sq mi (7.51 km^{2})
  - Water: 0 sq mi (0.00 km^{2})
- Elevation: 3,074 ft (937 m)

Population (2020)
  - Total: 65
  - Density: 22.4/sq mi (8.66/km^{2})
- Time zone: UTC-7 (Mountain (MST))
  - Summer (DST): UTC-6 (MDT)
- ZIP code: 59420
- Area code: 406
- FIPS code: 30-12625
- GNIS feature ID: 2407975

Carter is a census-designated place (CDP) in Chouteau County, Montana, United States. As of the 2020 census, Carter had a population of 65.

Carter's name was changed from Sidney in 1905 to honor Thomas H. Carter, the state's first congressional representative.

== Geography ==
Carter is located in western Chouteau County along U.S. Route 87, which leads northeast 14 miles (23 km) to Fort Benton, the county seat, and southwest 26 miles (42 km) to Great Falls.

According to the United States Census Bureau, the CDP has a total area of 2.9 square miles (7.5 km^{2}), of which 0.004 square miles (0.01 km^{2}), or 0.14%, is water.

=== Climate ===
According to the Köppen Climate Classification system, Carter has a semi-arid climate, abbreviated "BSk" on climate maps.

Climate data for Carter, Montana, 1991–2020 normals, extremes 1982–present
Month	Jan	Feb	Mar	Apr	May	Jun	Jul	Aug	Sep	Oct	Nov	Dec	Year
Record high °F (°C)	67 (19)	75 (24)	80 (27)	88 (31)	94 (34)	105 (41)	107 (42)	107 (42)	100 (38)	92 (33)	76 (24)	66 (19)	107 (42)
Mean maximum °F (°C)	55.4 (13.0)	57.9 (14.4)	67.7 (19.8)	77.0 (25.0)	84.8 (29.3)	91.3 (32.9)	99.6 (37.6)	98.5 (36.9)	92.3 (33.5)	81.1 (27.3)	65.6 (18.7)	55.0 (12.8)	101.0 (38.3)
Mean daily maximum °F (°C)	33.0 (0.6)	36.0 (2.2)	45.1 (7.3)	54.9 (12.7)	64.9 (18.3)	73.2 (22.9)	84.5 (29.2)	83.1 (28.4)	71.5 (21.9)	56.4 (13.6)	42.9 (6.1)	33.7 (0.9)	56.6 (13.7)
Daily mean °F (°C)	23.2 (−4.9)	24.9 (−3.9)	32.9 (0.5)	42.2 (5.7)	51.5 (10.8)	59.4 (15.2)	67.8 (19.9)	66.6 (19.2)	57.0 (13.9)	44.2 (6.8)	32.9 (0.5)	24.2 (−4.3)	43.9 (6.6)
Mean daily minimum °F (°C)	13.3 (−10.4)	13.8 (−10.1)	20.8 (−6.2)	29.4 (−1.4)	38.0 (3.3)	45.7 (7.6)	51.1 (10.6)	50.1 (10.1)	42.5 (5.8)	32.1 (0.1)	22.9 (−5.1)	14.7 (−9.6)	31.2 (−0.4)
Mean minimum °F (°C)	−15.4 (−26.3)	−9.6 (−23.1)	−2.6 (−19.2)	13.3 (−10.4)	24.8 (−4.0)	35.0 (1.7)	42.0 (5.6)	39.8 (4.3)	28.8 (−1.8)	11.9 (−11.2)	−1.1 (−18.4)	−10.3 (−23.5)	−23.8 (−31.0)
Record low °F (°C)	−37 (−38)	−34 (−37)	−29 (−34)	−4 (−20)	12 (−11)	29 (−2)	31 (−1)	31 (−1)	11 (−12)	−13 (−25)	−27 (−33)	−36 (−38)	−37 (−38)
Average precipitation inches (mm)	0.46 (12)	0.43 (11)	0.59 (15)	1.60 (41)	2.48 (63)	2.61 (66)	1.19 (30)	1.19 (30)	1.18 (30)	1.05 (27)	0.58 (15)	0.44 (11)	13.8 (351)
Average snowfall inches (cm)	7.1 (18)	6.9 (18)	7.5 (19)	5.3 (13)	1.6 (4.1)	0.2 (0.51)	0.0 (0.0)	0.0 (0.0)	0.0 (0.0)	2.1 (5.3)	6.1 (15)	5.7 (14)	42.5 (106.91)
Average precipitation days (≥ 0.01 in)	4.6	4.5	5.2	7.5	8.8	9.9	5.9	5.2	5.2	5.3	4.4	3.8	70.3
Average snowy days (≥ 0.1 in)	3.9	3.6	3.4	2.2	0.8	0.1	0.0	0.0	0.0	1.4	2.6	2.9	20.9
Source 1: NOAA
Source 2: National Weather Service

== Demographics ==
Historical population
Census	Pop.	Note	%±
2020	65		—
U.S. Decennial Census

As of the census of 2000, there were 62 people, 31 households, and 19 families residing in the CDP. The population density was 21.3 inhabitants per square mile (8.2/km^{2}). There were 34 housing units at an average density of 11.7 per square mile (4.5/km^{2}). The racial makeup of the CDP was 100.00% White.

There were 31 households, out of which 12.9% had children under the age of 18 living with them, 58.1% were married couples living together, 3.2% had a female householder with no husband present, and 38.7% were non-families. 32.3% of all households were made up of individuals, and 12.9% had someone living alone who was 65 years of age or older. The average household size was 2.00 and the average family size was 2.42.

In the CDP, the population was spread out, with 12.9% under the age of 18, 4.8% from 18 to 24, 27.4% from 25 to 44, 30.6% from 45 to 64, and 24.2% who were 65 years of age or older. The median age was 47 years. For every 100 females, there were 100.0 males. For every 100 females age 18 and over, there were 116.0 males.

The median income for a household in the CDP was $24,583, and the median income for a family was $33,125. Males had a median income of $16,250 versus $23,125 for females. The per capita income for the CDP was $19,397. There were 9.5% of families and 13.4% of the population living below the poverty line, including 33.3% of under eighteens and 12.0% of those over 64.

== Hall of Fame ==
The Carter, Montana Hall of Fame honors celebrities who have visited the city. As of 2010, there were seven inductees, including Keanu Reeves, Arsenio Hall, Charlie Sheen, Eddie Vedder, Steve Smith and Harry Truman. Professional wrestler CM Punk was inducted into the Hall of Fame on May 15, 2010.

== The Carter Ferry ==
The Carter ferry is a free service and can carry 2 passenger cars at a time. The Carter Ferry was established by Chouteau County in 1917 at a cost of $850. It was required to follow the Montana State Highway Department specifications. It was replaced and updated in years 1945 and 2004. An operator uses an engine and cable system to pull the double-hulled boats across the Missouri River. Carter Ferry is also a state fishing and public access site.
