= Manlius Township, Bureau County, Illinois =

Manlius Township
- Township
- Location in Bureau County

- Bureau County's location in Illinois
- Coordinates: 41°27′12″N 89°40′44″W
- Country: United States
- State: Illinois
- County: Bureau
- Established: November 6, 1849

Area
  - Total: 36.25 sq mi (93.9 km^{2})
  - Land: 36.22 sq mi (93.8 km^{2})
  - Water: 0.03 sq mi (0.078 km^{2}) 0.08%
- Elevation: 702 ft (214 m)

Population (2020)
  - Total: 574
  - Density: 15.8/sq mi (6.12/km^{2})
- Time zone: UTC-6 (CST)
  - Summer (DST): UTC-5 (CDT)
- ZIP codes: 61338, 61361, 61376, 61379
- FIPS code: 17-011-46435

Manlius Township is one of twenty-five townships in Bureau County, Illinois, USA. As of the 2020 census, its population was 574 and it contained 306 housing units. Manlius Township changed its name from Green River Township on an unknown date.

== Geography ==
According to the 2010 census, the township has a total area of 36.25 square miles (93.9 km^{2}), of which 36.22 square miles (93.8 km^{2}) (or 99.92%) is land and 0.03 square miles (0.078 km^{2}) (or 0.08%) is water.

=== Cities ===
- Manlius

=== Cemeteries ===
The township contains these three cemeteries: Follett, Manlius and Sand Hill Baptist.

=== Major highways ===
- Illinois Route 40

== Demographics ==
As of the 2020 census there were 574 people, 246 households, and 158 families residing in the township. The population density was 15.83 inhabitants per square mile (6.11/km^{2}). There were 306 housing units at an average density of 8.44 per square mile (3.26/km^{2}). The racial makeup of the township was 93.90% White, 0.17% African American, 0.00% Native American, 0.17% Asian, 0.17% Pacific Islander, 0.52% from other races, and 5.05% from two or more races. Hispanic or Latino of any race were 2.09% of the population.

There were 246 households, out of which 17.10% had children under the age of 18 living with them, 48.37% were married couples living together, 10.57% had a female householder with no spouse present, and 35.77% were non-families. 34.60% of all households were made up of individuals, and 22.00% had someone living alone who was 65 years of age or older. The average household size was 2.11 and the average family size was 2.59.

The township's age distribution consisted of 12.5% under the age of 18, 11.2% from 18 to 24, 25.8% from 25 to 44, 31.5% from 45 to 64, and 18.9% who were 65 years of age or older. The median age was 45.5 years. For every 100 females, there were 142.5 males. For every 100 females age 18 and over, there were 145.4 males.

The median income for a household in the township was $59,167, and the median income for a family was $105,000. Males had a median income of $37,813 versus $36,202 for females. The per capita income for the township was $36,438. About 6.3% of families and 12.2% of the population were below the poverty line, including 9.8% of those under age 18 and 14.3% of those age 65 or over.

Historical population
Census	Pop.	Note	%±
2010	653		—
2020	574		−12.1%
U.S. Decennial Census

== School districts ==
- Bureau Valley Community Unit School District 340

== Political districts ==
- Illinois' 11th congressional district
- State House District 74
- State Senate District 37
