= List of mountains in Chouteau County, Montana =

There are at least 58 named mountains in Chouteau County, Montana.

- Antelope Butte, 47°31′10″N 110°10′28″W, el. 3,819 feet (1,164 m)
- Arrow Peak, 47°25′32″N 110°31′35″W, el. 7,447 feet (2,270 m)
- Black Butte, 48°14′12″N 110°32′40″W, el. 3,038 feet (926 m)
- Black Mountain, 48°09′30″N 109°42′02″W, el. 6,247 feet (1,904 m)
- Black Rock, 47°56′31″N 110°11′06″W, el. 2,894 feet (882 m)
- Buckskin Butte, 47°30′11″N 110°13′10″W, el. 3,822 feet (1,165 m)
- Carter Mountain, 47°33′37″N 110°31′31″W, el. 5,482 feet (1,671 m)
- Centennial Mountain, 48°12′34″N 109°50′13″W, el. 5,807 feet (1,770 m)
- Chase Hill, 47°48′02″N 109°33′55″W, el. 3,241 feet (988 m)
- Chimney Rock, 47°57′26″N 110°11′43″W, el. 2,821 feet (860 m)
- Chinaman Hill, 47°51′53″N 110°44′22″W, el. 3,091 feet (942 m)
- Churchill Butte, 47°52′38″N 110°24′56″W, el. 2,926 feet (892 m)
- Dark Butte, 47°46′37″N 109°55′59″W, el. 3,084 feet (940 m)
- Discovery Butte, 48°07′52″N 110°36′26″W, el. 3,113 feet (949 m)
- Dunbar Hill, 47°34′31″N 110°48′13″W, el. 3,484 feet (1,062 m)
- Eagle Buttes, 47°51′11″N 110°01′52″W, el. 2,940 feet (900 m)
- East Knee, 48°00′34″N 111°16′39″W, el. 3,697 feet (1,127 m)
- East Peak, 47°25′33″N 110°28′05″W, el. 6,965 feet (2,123 m)
- Flying A Butte, 48°06′03″N 109°49′21″W, el. 4,849 feet (1,478 m)
- Fortress Rock, 47°58′11″N 110°07′01″W, el. 2,687 feet (819 m)
- Fourmile Hill, 47°46′11″N 109°42′11″W, el. 2,644 feet (806 m)
- Goose Bill Butte, 48°03′47″N 110°48′17″W, el. 3,763 feet (1,147 m)
- Gossack Mountain, 47°32′05″N 110°41′46″W, el. 5,187 feet (1,581 m)
- Harris Mountain, 47°31′48″N 110°44′04″W, el. 5,069 feet (1,545 m)
- Hay Stack Coulee, 48°00′01″N 111°10′08″W, el. 3,560 feet (1,090 m)
- Haystack Butte, 47°38′15″N 110°13′21″W, el. 3,287 feet (1,002 m)
- Haystack Butte, 48°02′40″N 109°36′06″W, el. 4,111 feet (1,253 m)
- Haystack Butte, 47°54′33″N 109°52′20″W, el. 3,195 feet (974 m)
- Highwood Baldy, 47°26′33″N 110°37′52″W, el. 7,657 feet (2,334 m)
- Johnson Hill, 47°46′02″N 109°38′38″W, el. 2,963 feet (903 m)
- Libby Hills, 47°27′44″N 110°22′24″W, el. 4,737 feet (1,444 m)
- Lidstone Hill, 47°45′56″N 109°42′51″W, el. 2,976 feet (907 m)
- Little Bear Peak, 48°12′51″N 109°45′27″W, el. 5,335 feet (1,626 m)
- McNamara Butte, 48°02′46″N 109°50′32″W, el. 3,829 feet (1,167 m)
- Mount Hancock, 48°05′28″N 109°51′50″W, el. 4,590 feet (1,400 m)
- Mount Kennon, 47°29′46″N 110°29′50″W, el. 5,587 feet (1,703 m)
- Palisade Butte, 47°27′57″N 110°22′55″W, el. 4,951 feet (1,509 m)
- Parker Butte, 48°13′09″N 109°43′52″W, el. 5,171 feet (1,576 m)
- Prospect Peak, 47°27′26″N 110°30′32″W, el. 6,519 feet (1,987 m)
- Rattlesnake Butte, 48°01′29″N 109°36′46″W, el. 4,190 feet (1,280 m)
- Rattlesnake Butte, 48°04′28″N 109°56′24″W, el. 3,697 feet (1,127 m)
- Rattlesnake Butte, 48°09′42″N 110°01′52″W, el. 3,113 feet (949 m)
- Round Butte, 47°27′43″N 110°18′55″W, el. 5,331 feet (1,625 m)
- Round Top, 47°48′57″N 110°29′34″W, el. 3,110 feet (950 m)
- Ryan Butte, 48°04′55″N 109°52′10″W, el. 4,518 feet (1,377 m)
- Sawmill Butte, 48°05′48″N 109°44′41″W, el. 5,403 feet (1,647 m)
- Shaws Peak, 47°46′41″N 110°30′04″W, el. 3,353 feet (1,022 m)
- Shepherd Butte, 47°34′57″N 110°56′26″W, el. 3,655 feet (1,114 m)
- Square Butte, 47°28′31″N 110°14′34″W, el. 5,732 feet (1,747 m)
- Steamboat Rock, 47°47′22″N 109°57′08″W, el. 2,802 feet (854 m)
- Studhorse Butte, 48°04′12″N 109°56′59″W, el. 3,829 feet (1,167 m)
- Table Butte, 48°14′30″N 109°55′18″W, el. 3,484 feet (1,062 m)
- The Rock, 48°05′24″N 109°35′31″W, el. 4,839 feet (1,475 m)
- Tiger Butte, 48°02′10″N 109°39′08″W, el. 4,842 feet (1,476 m)
- Tox Hill, 47°46′17″N 109°41′13″W, el. 2,759 feet (841 m)
- West Knee, 48°00′41″N 111°20′46″W, el. 3,868 feet (1,179 m)
- Wild Horse Butte, 47°41′10″N 109°53′45″W, el. 3,182 feet (970 m)
- Windy Mountain, 47°29′42″N 110°33′50″W, el. 5,889 feet (1,795 m)

== See also ==
- List of mountains in Montana
- List of mountain ranges in Montana
