= Square Butte =

Square Butte may refer to:

- Square Butte, Montana, an unincorporated community
- Square Butte (Montana), multiple summits in Montana
- Square Butte (transmission line), an electrical transmission line in Minnesota
- Square Butte Creek, a stream in North Dakota
