= Bishops Cap =

Mountain pass in Montana, United States

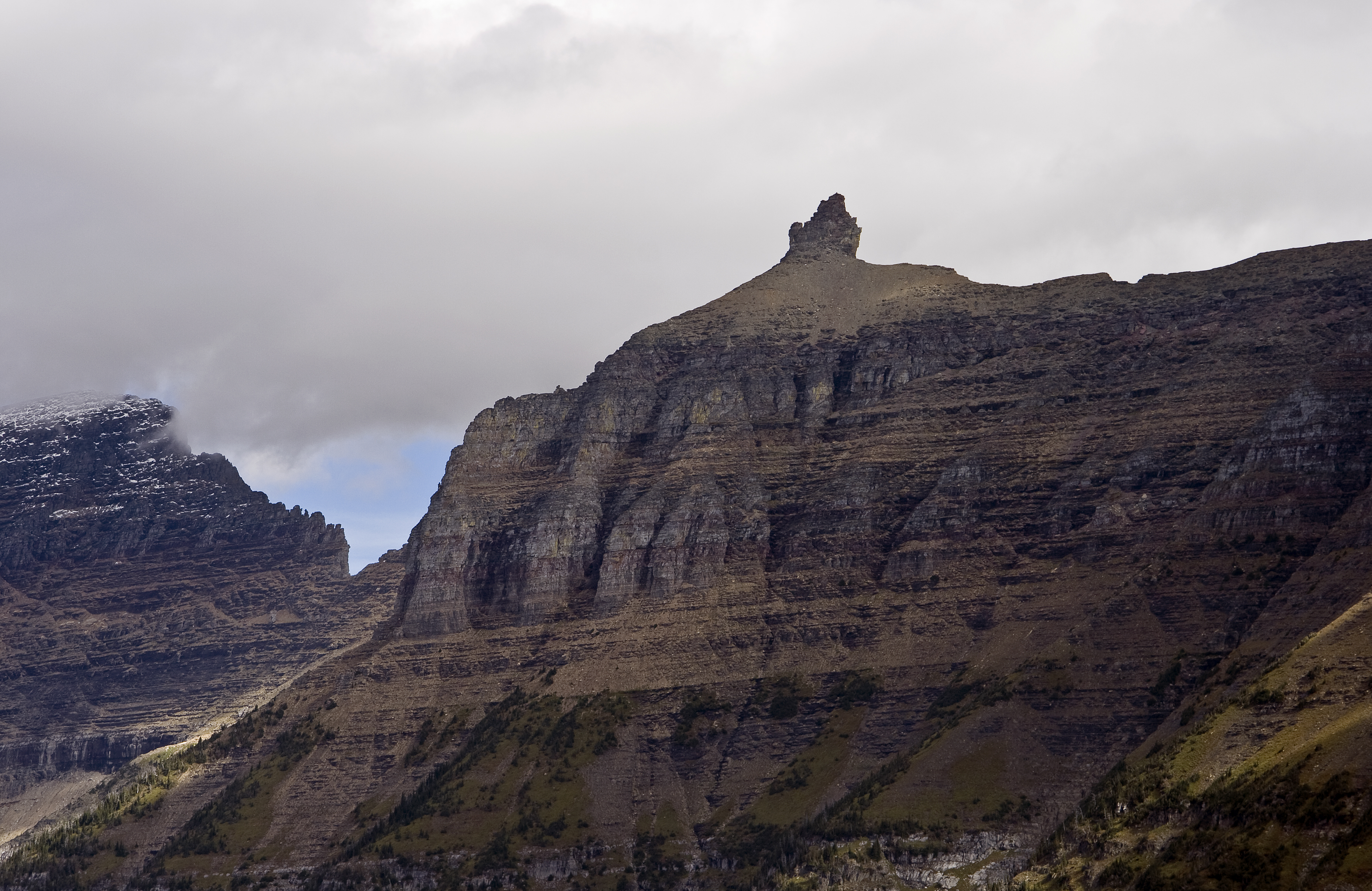
- Bishops Cap along the Garden Wall

Highest point
- Elevation: 9,127 ft (2,782 m)
- Prominence: 327 ft (100 m)
- Parent peak: Pollock Mountain (9,195 ft)
- Isolation: 0.67 mi (1.08 km)
- Coordinates: 48°43′29″N 113°42′33″W

Geography
- Location within Montana Location within the United States
- Location: Flathead County /Glacier County; Montana, US
- Parent range: Lewis Range
- Topo map(s): USGS Logan Pass, MT

Bishops Cap (9,127 feet (2,782 m)) is located in the Lewis Range, Glacier National Park in the U.S. state of Montana. Located above the Garden Wall and straddling the Continental Divide, when viewed from the south at Logan Pass, the peak appears to resemble a Bishop's headwear. The name Bishops Cap is descriptive only. The name has no known origin.

== Geology ==
Like other mountains in Glacier National Park, Bishops Cap is composed of sedimentary rock laid down during the Precambrian to Jurassic periods. Formed in shallow seas, this sedimentary rock was initially uplifted beginning 170 million years ago when the Lewis Overthrust fault pushed an enormous slab of precambrian rocks 3 mi (4.8 km) thick, 50 miles (80 km) wide and 160 miles (260 km) long over younger rock of the cretaceous period.

== Climate ==
According to the Köppen climate classification system, Bishops Cap is located in an alpine subarctic climate zone with long, cold, snowy winters, and cool to warm summers. Winter temperatures can drop below −10 °F with wind chill factors below −30 °F. Due to its altitude, it receives precipitation all year, as snow in winter, and as thunderstorms in summer.

== Gallery ==
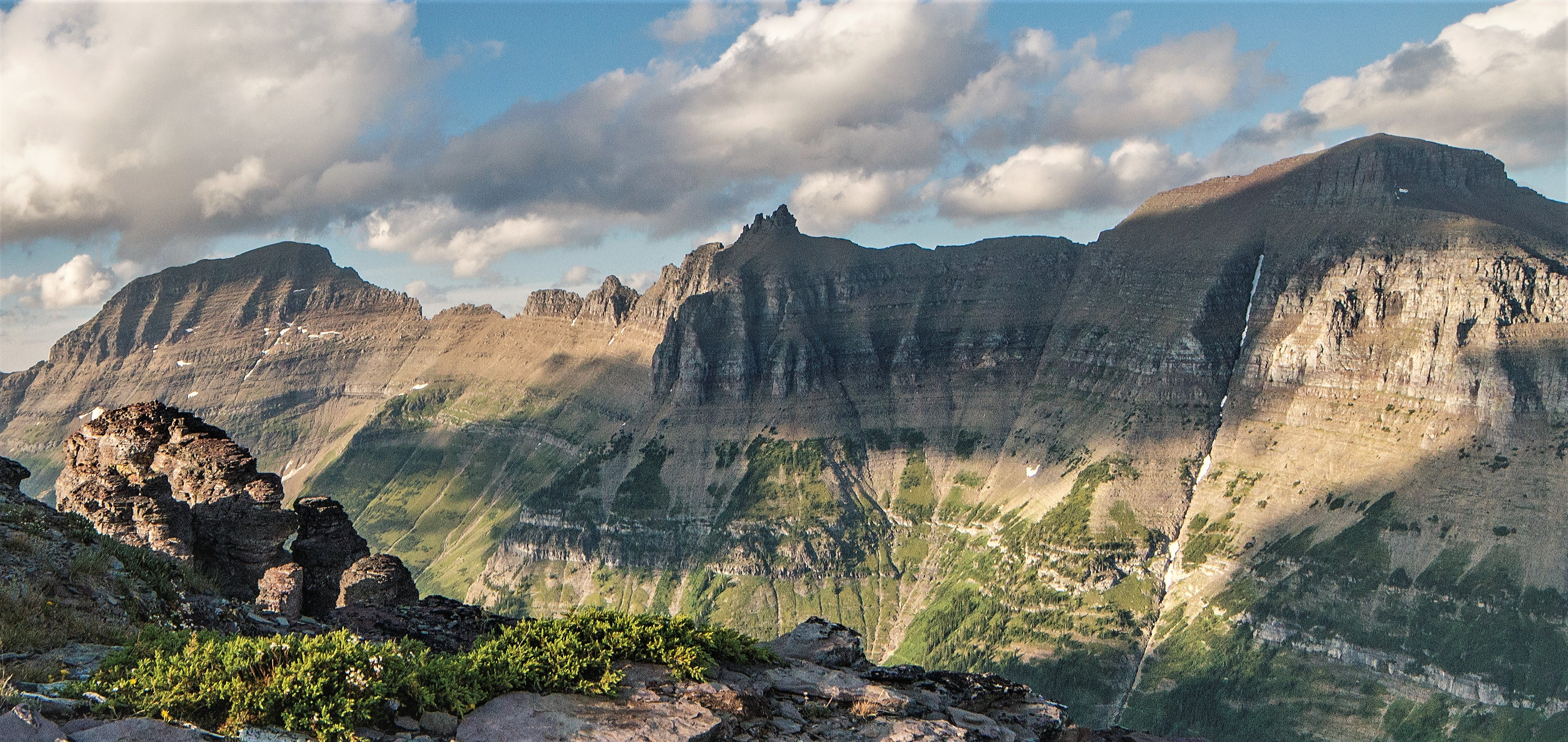
Mt. Gould (left), Bishops Cap (center), Pollock Mountain (right) from Mt. Oberlin

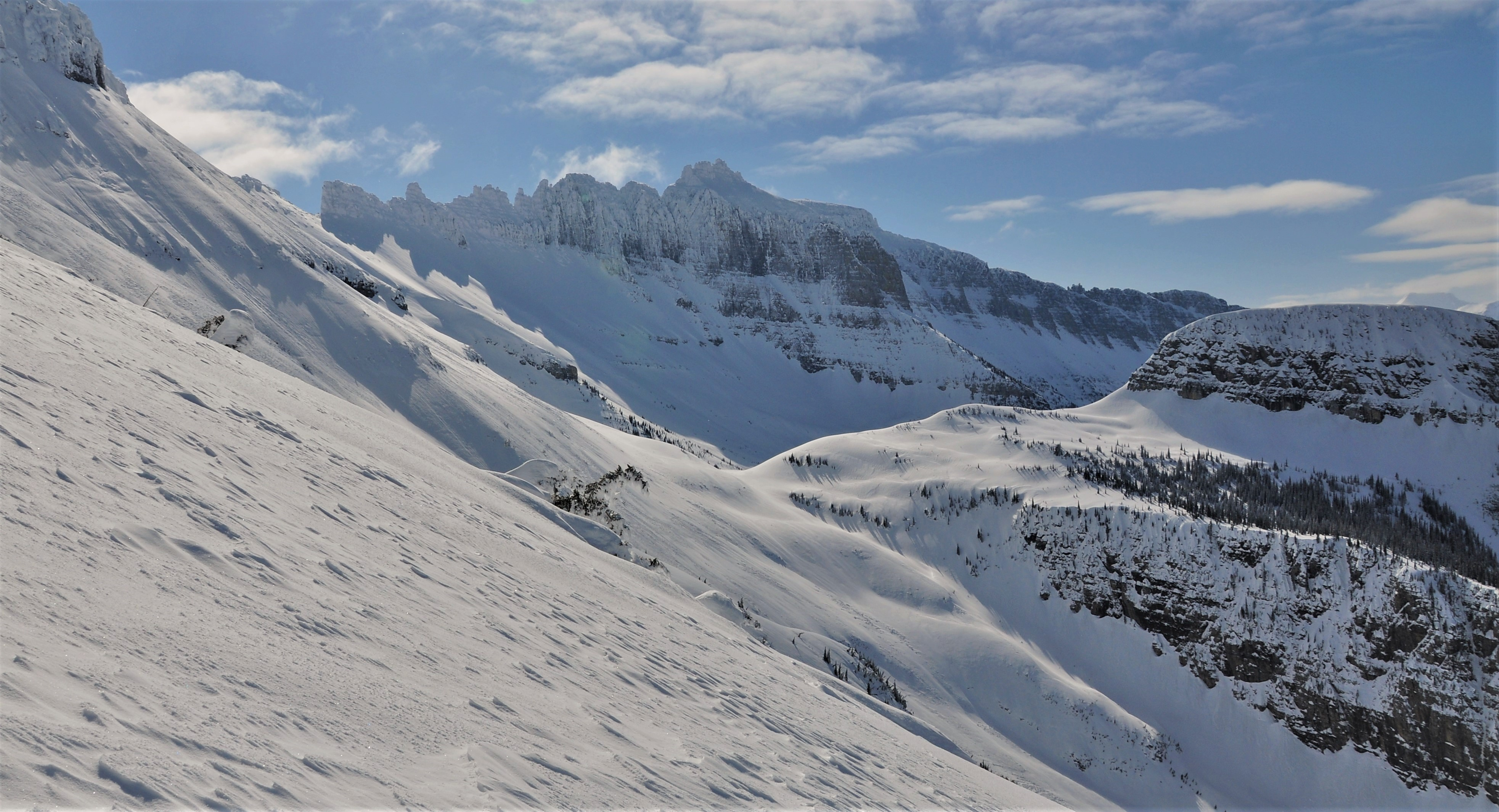
Bishops Cap (centered) with Haystack Butte to the right, from the northwest.

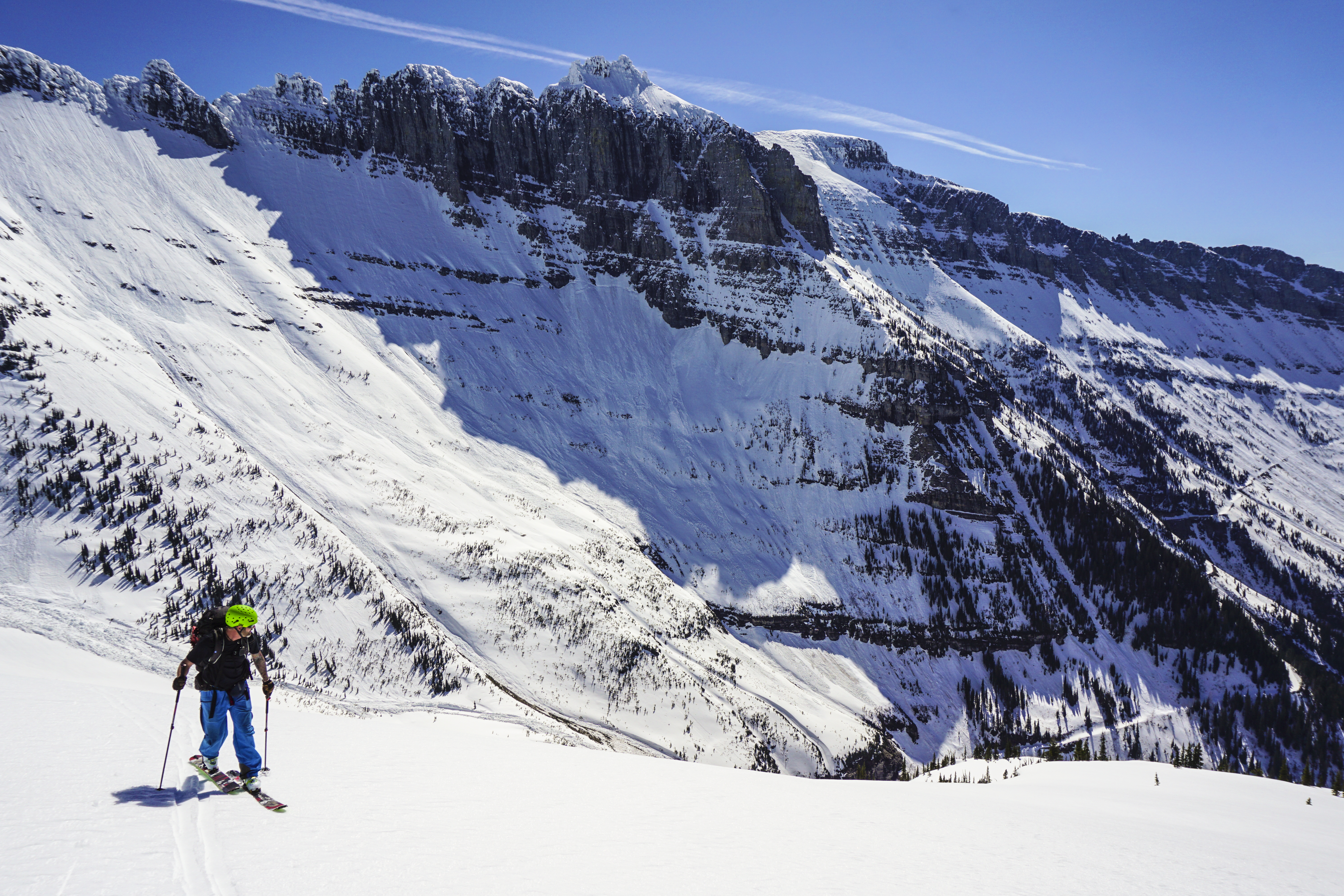
Bishops Cap (centered) seen from Haystack Butte

== See also ==
- Mountains and mountain ranges of Glacier National Park (U.S.)
