= Weeping Wall (Montana) =

Geological formation in Glacier National Park

- Cliff
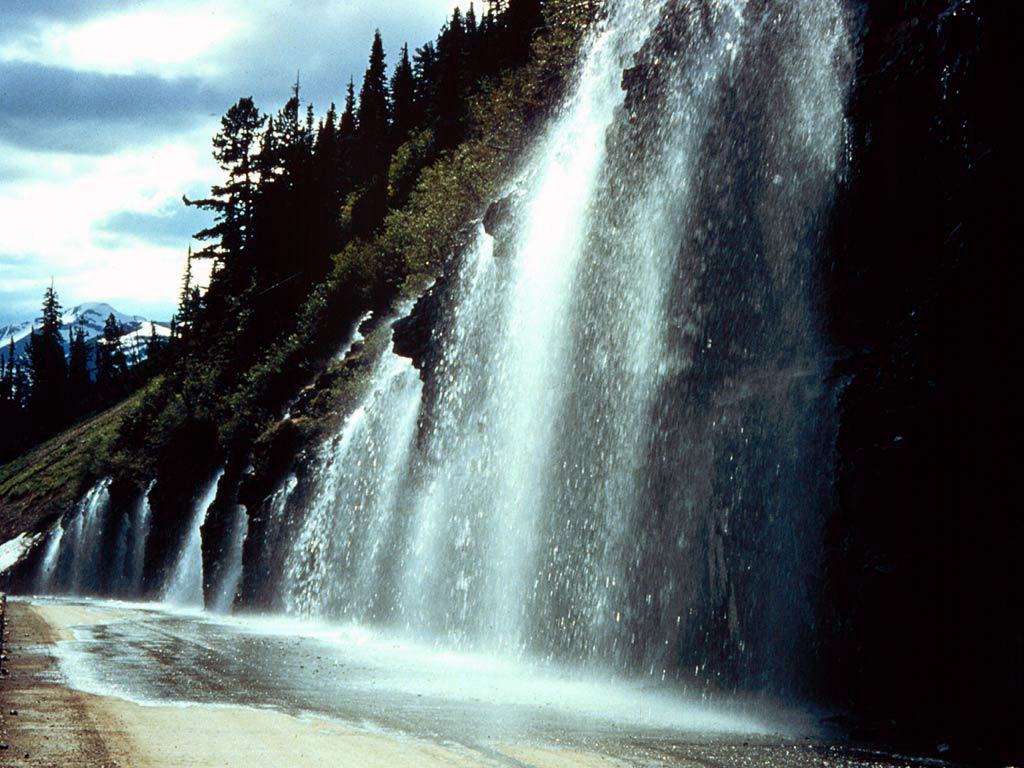
- Interactive map of Weeping Wall
- Coordinates: 48°43′36.91″N 113°43′42.42″W
- Location: Glacier National Park
- Range: Lewis Range
- Elevation: 1,747 m (5,732 ft)
- Topo map: USGS Logan Pass
- Country: United States
- State: Montana
- County: Flathead County

Weeping Wall is a geological formation found along Going-to-the-Sun Road in Glacier National Park, in the U.S. state of Montana. It is a natural waterfall that seeps out from the side of Haystack Butte and the Garden Wall, and is fed by runoff from snowmelt.

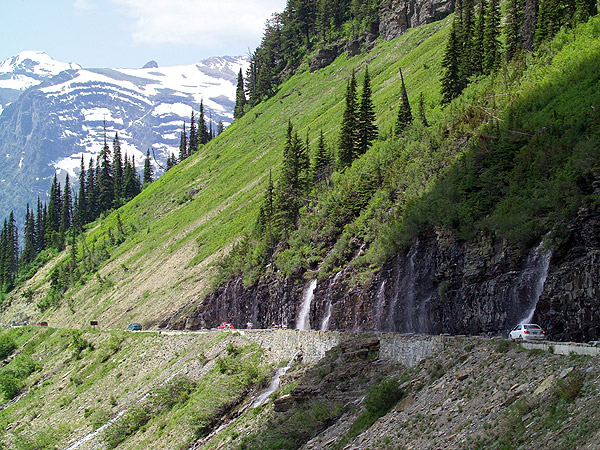

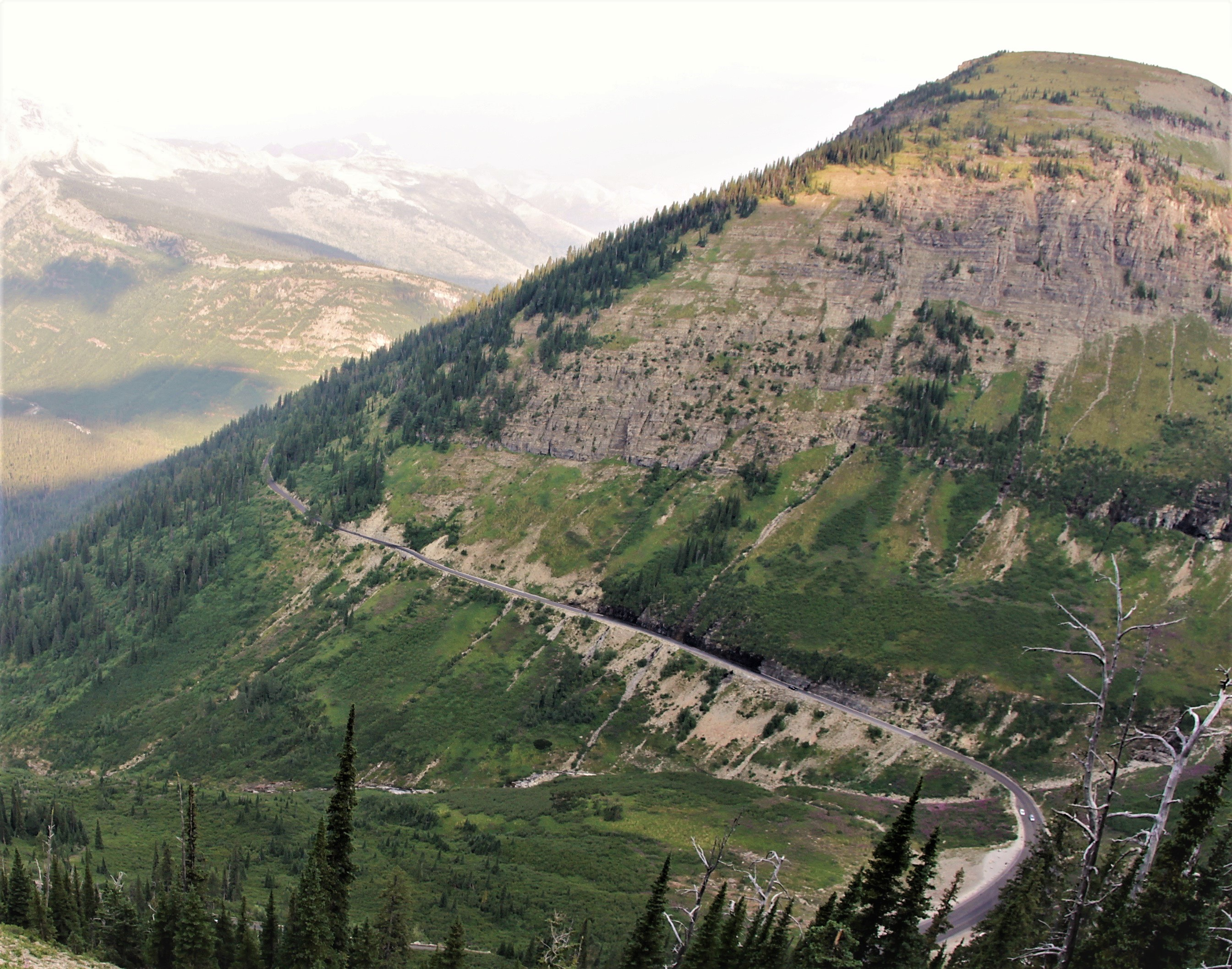
Haystack Butte with Weeping Wall

== See also ==
- List of waterfalls
