= Pollock Mountain =

Mountain in Montana, United States

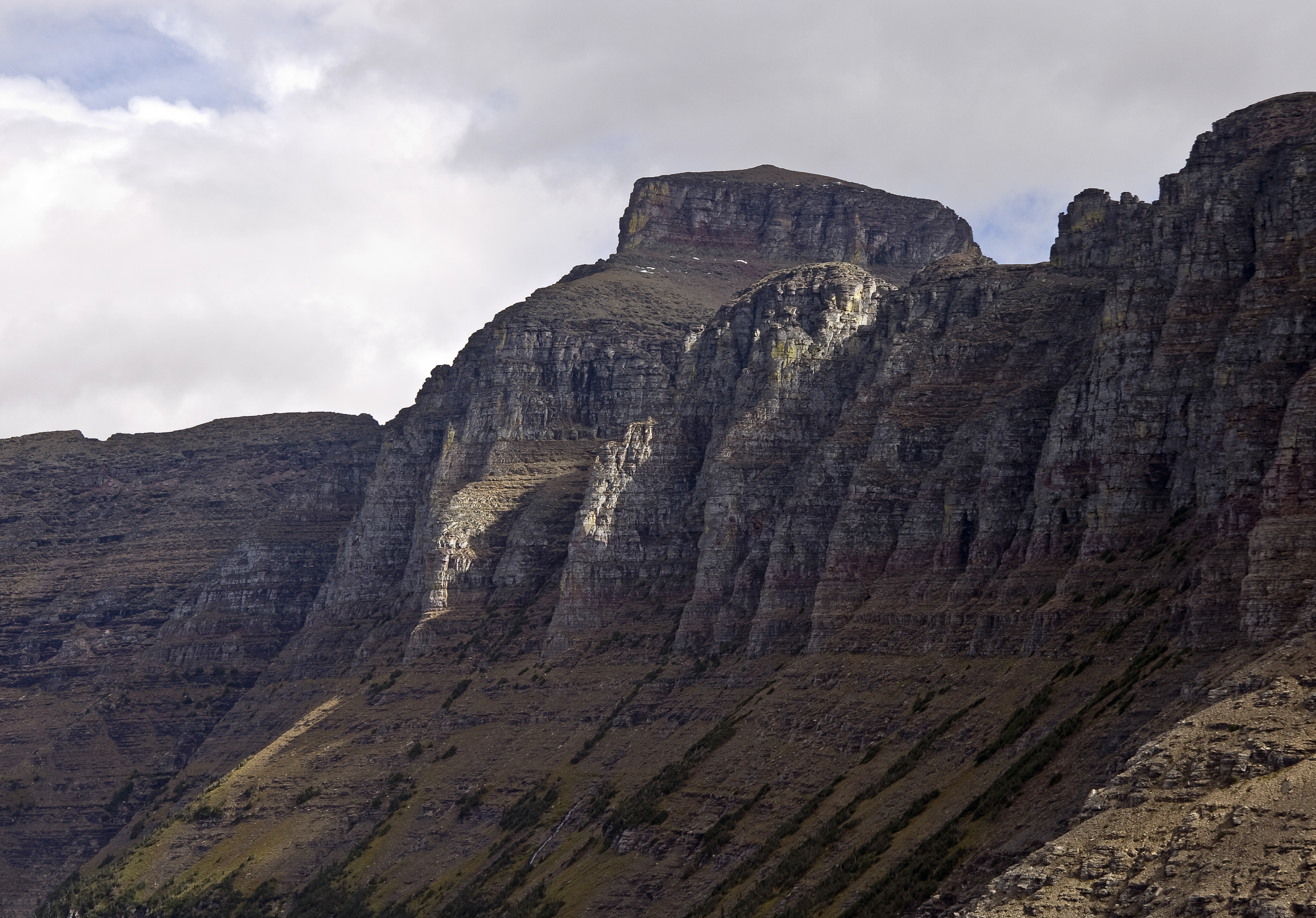
- Pollock Mountain above the Garden Wall

Highest point
- Elevation: 9,195 ft (2,803 m)
- Prominence: 550 ft (170 m)
- Coordinates: 48°43′01″N 113°42′09″W

Naming
- Etymology: William C. Pollock

Geography
- Location within Montana Location within the United States
- Location: Flathead County / Glacier County; Montana, U.S.
- Parent range: Lewis Range
- Topo map(s): USGS Logan Pass, MT

Pollock Mountain (9,195 feet (2,803 m)) is located in the Lewis Range, Glacier National Park in the U.S. state of Montana. Pollock Mountain is situated along the Continental Divide and is one of the peaks along the Garden Wall and is approximately .6 miles (0.97 km) south of Bishops Cap. The mountain was named by Ross Carter for William C. Pollock, a member of the Indian Commission who along with Walter M. Clements and George Bird Grinnell negotiated with the Blackfeet to consummate the treaty that enabled the Federal Government to purchase the "Ceded Strip" of land, which included all of what is now Glacier National Park to the east of the Continental Divide.

== Geology ==
Like other mountains in Glacier National Park, the peak is composed of sedimentary rock laid down during the Precambrian to Jurassic periods. Formed in shallow seas, this sedimentary rock was initially uplifted beginning 170 million years ago when the Lewis Overthrust fault pushed an enormous slab of precambrian rocks 3 mi (4.8 km) thick, 50 miles (80 km) wide and 160 miles (260 km) long over younger rock of the cretaceous period.

== Climate ==
Based on the Köppen climate classification, the peak is located in an alpine subarctic climate zone with long, cold, snowy winters, and cool to warm summers. Winter temperatures can drop below −10 °F with wind chill factors below −30 °F.

== Gallery ==
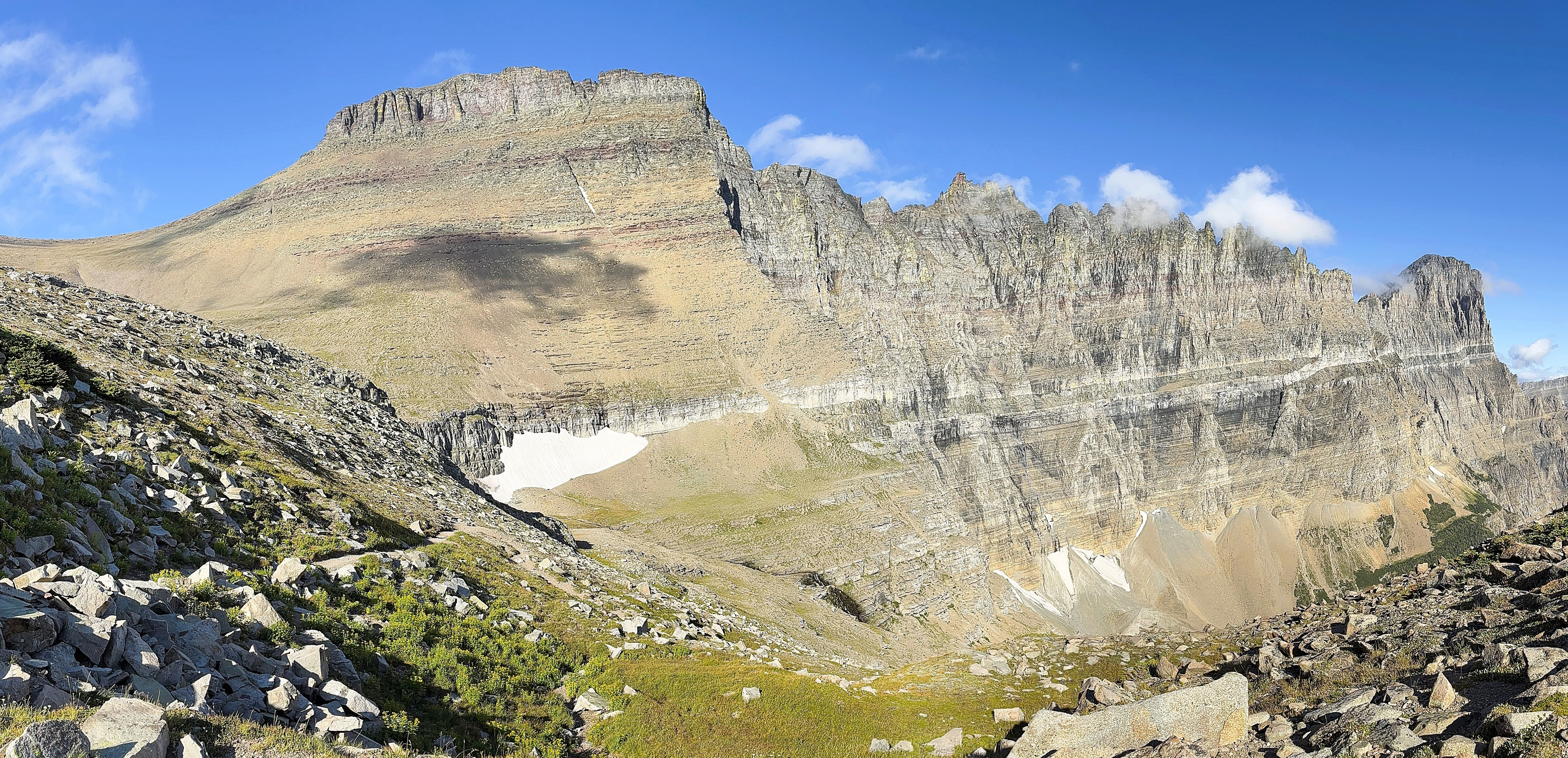
East aspect

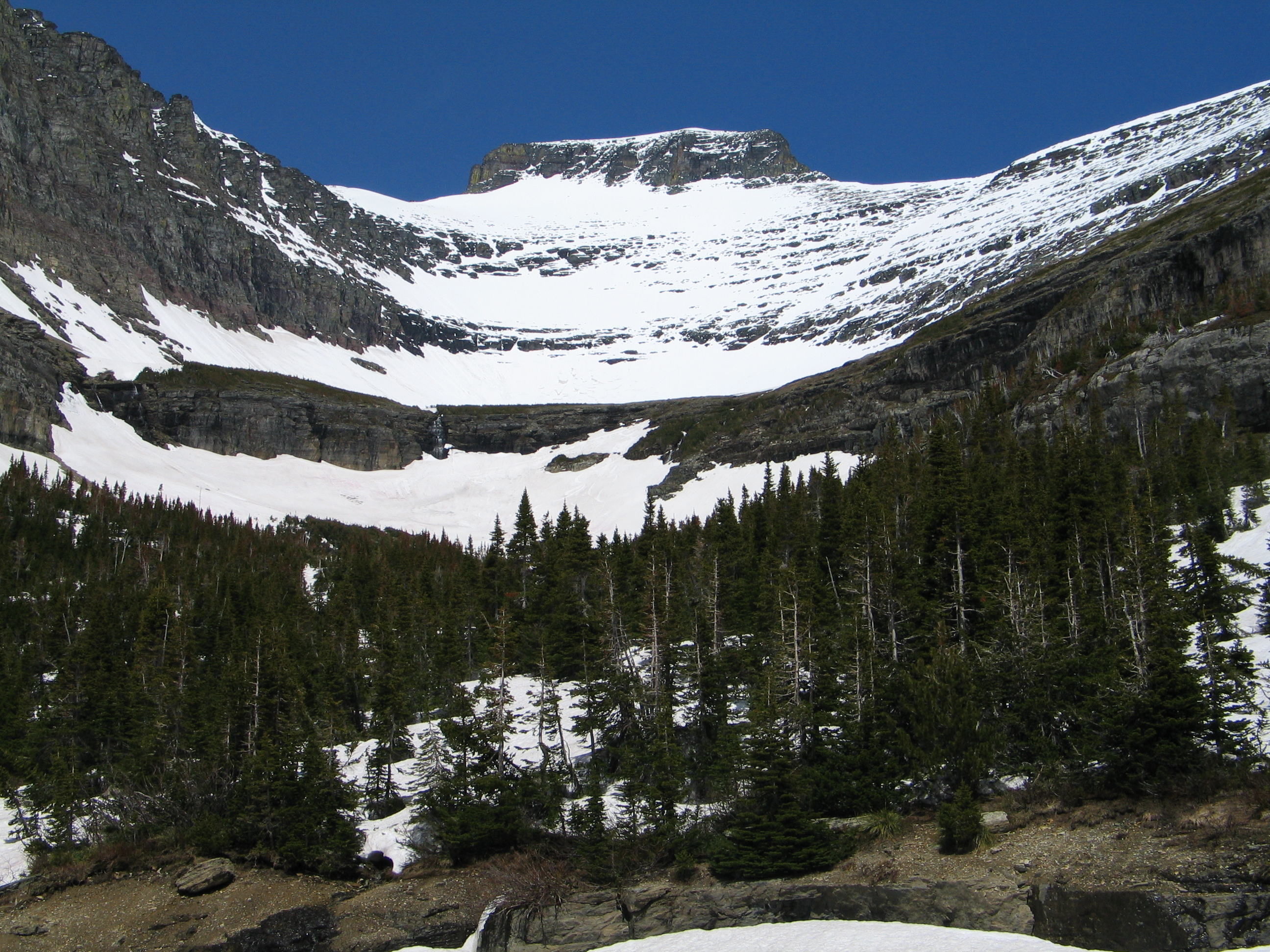
South aspect seen from Going-to-the-Sun Road at Lunch Creek

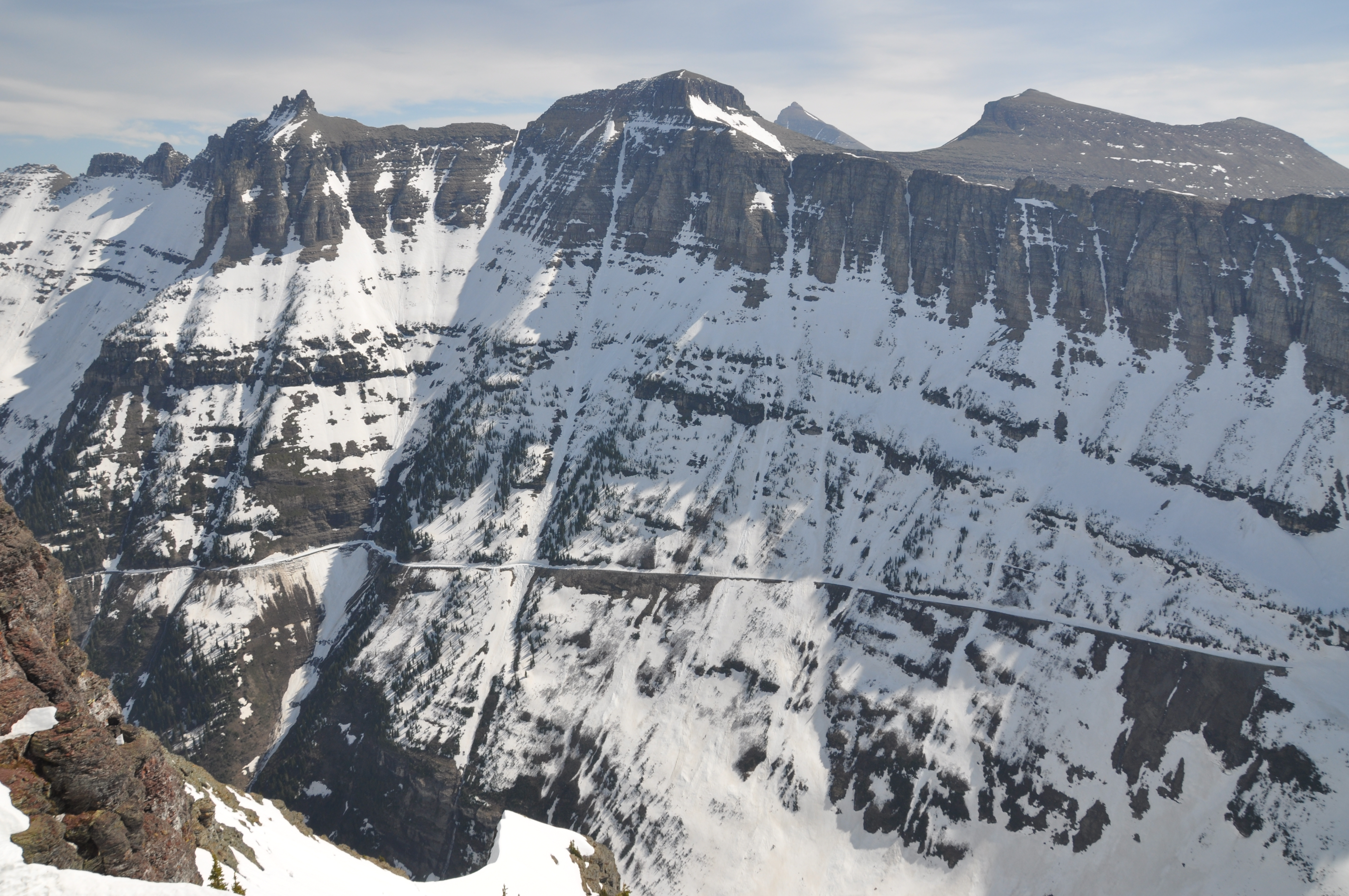
Pollock Mountain and Garden Wall

== See also ==
- Mountains and mountain ranges of Glacier National Park (U.S.)
