= Square Butte Creek =

Stream in North Dakota, U.S.

Coordinates: 47°3′37.58″N 101°11′40.22″W

Square Butte Creek is a stream in the U.S. state of North Dakota.

The creek was so named on account of square-shaped buttes along its course.

The creek (USGS GNIS ID: 1032261) is a tributary of the Missouri River, partially draining into the river as a diversion canal northeast of the community of Harmon (46.965521, -100.938544) before turning south to southeast with the mouth north of Mandan (46.9049927, -100.9131891) in the community of Rock Haven.

== See also ==
- List of rivers of North Dakota
