= Square Butte (Montana) =

Square Butte is a name used for 11 buttes in the U.S. state of Montana. Two of the most prominent are located in Cascade County, Montana, about 22 miles (35 km) due west of Great Falls, and Chouteau County, Montana, about 50 miles (80 km) due east of Great Falls and about 15 miles (24 km) east of the Highwood Mountains. Charles Marion Russell, the noted Montana western artist, used both features as backgrounds in his paintings of Montana.

== Square Butte in Cascade County ==
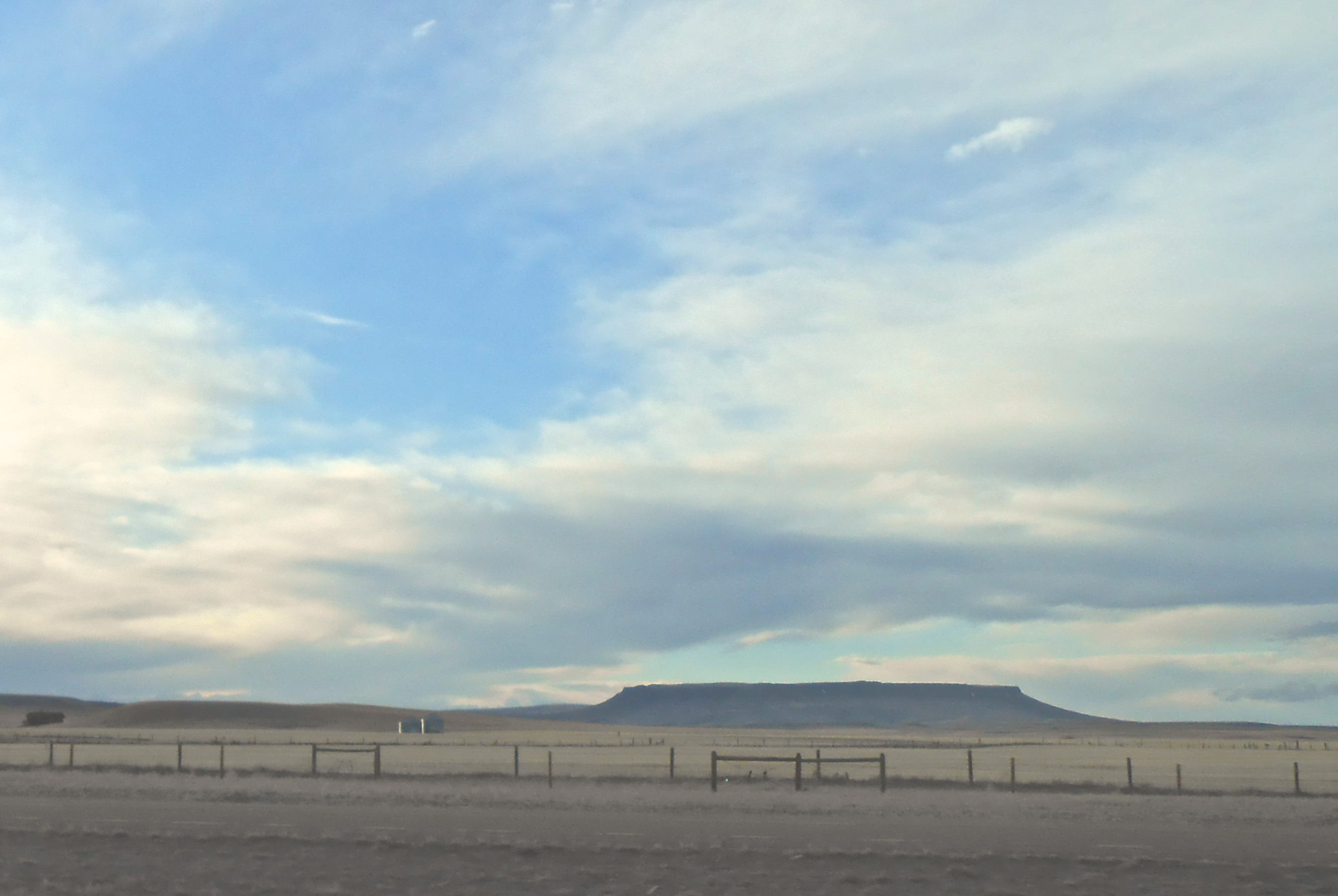
Square Butte in Cascade County, as seen from Interstate 15

Square Butte in Cascade County, Montana, 47°26′30″N 111°44′50″W, is located about 22 miles (35 km) due west of Great Falls, Montana. The highest elevation of the Cascade County Square Butte is 4,728 feet (1,441 m).

Square Butte is easily visible for many miles around. It is a prominent feature on the northern skyline as a motorist travels along Interstate 15, west of Great Falls in the vicinity of mile marker 264. It is also visible on the southern skyline while traveling on Montana Highway 200 in the vicinity of Sun River and Fort Shaw. To the west of Square Butte is another topographic feature, Crown Butte.

Lewis and Clark Pass crosses the continental divide at the crest of the Northern Rocky Mountains which lie to the west of the Cascade County Square Butte. From that pass, on July 7, 1806, the explorer Meriwether Lewis, returning eastward from his journey to the mouth of the Columbia River and the Pacific Ocean, saw Square Butte on the skyline of the eastern Montana prairie, writing in his journal:

"2 m. passing the dividing ridge between the waters of the Columbia and Missouri rivers at 1/4 of a mile [Lewis and Clark Pass]. from this gap which is low and an easy ascent on the W. side, the fort mountain [Square Butte] bears North Eaast, and appears to be distant about 20 miles."

From that pass on a clear day, the Cascade County Square Butte can still be seen, though at closer to 40 miles (64 km) distant instead of the 20 miles reported by Lewis.

== Square Butte in Chouteau County ==
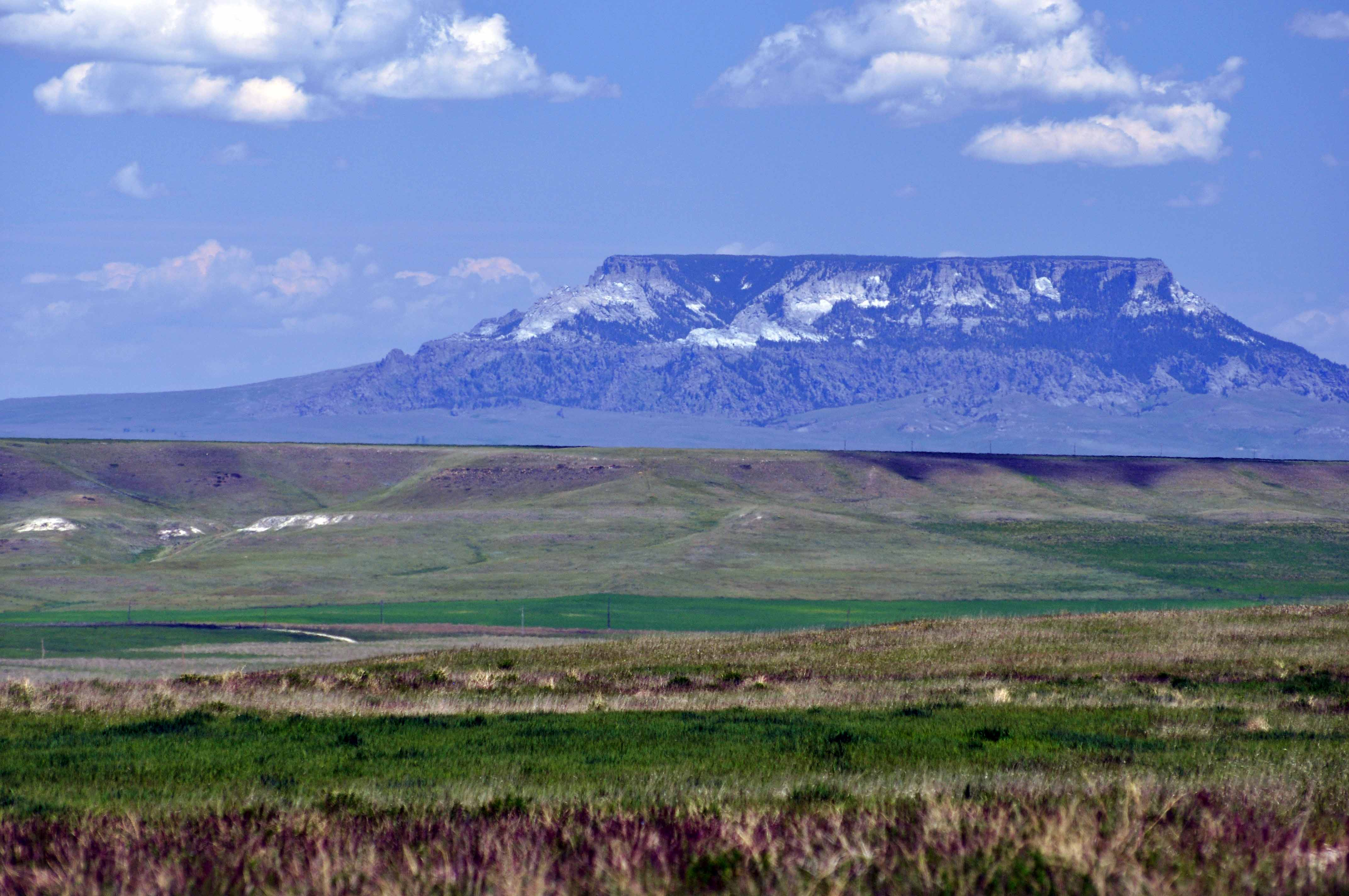
Southern face Square Butte

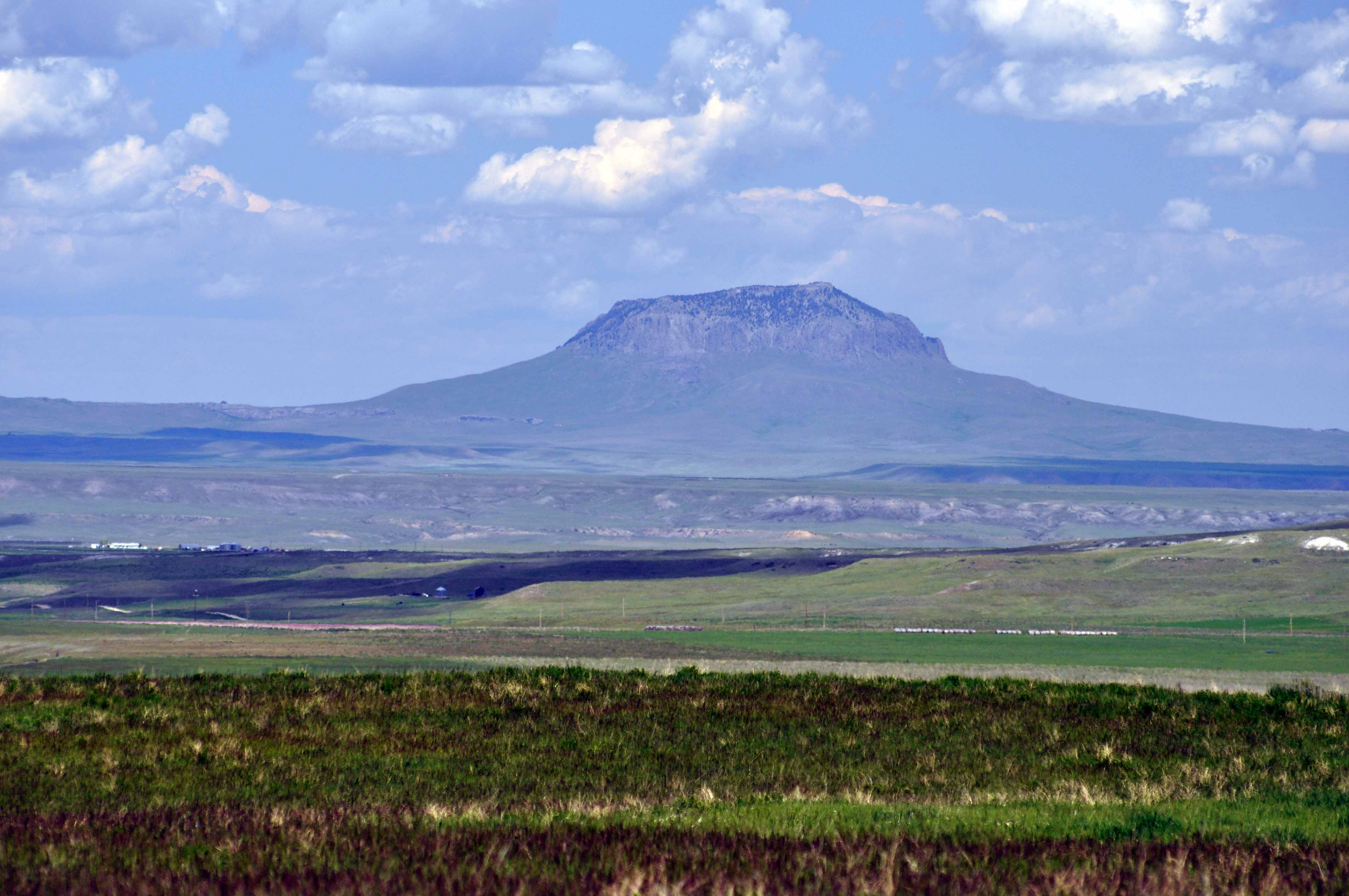
Round Butte

Square Butte in Chouteau County, Montana, 47°30′54″N 110°11′54″W, is located about 50 miles (80 km) due east of the city of Great Falls, Montana, and about 15 miles (24 km) east of the center of the Highwood Mountains. The highest elevation of the Chouteau County Square Butte is 5,732 feet (1,747 m).

This Square Butte also forms a unique and easily visible landmark on the horizon. It is visible from Montana Highway 3 between Geyser and Stanford, Montana. It is also visible from Montana Highway 80 between Stanford and Geraldine, Montana, which passes just to the east of the butte. The small, almost dormant town of Square Butte, Montana lies just at the base of the Chouteau County butte, on Montana Highway 80. About 4 miles (6.4 km) to the west of Square Butte is a smaller feature known as Round Butte.

== Paintings by C. M. Russell ==
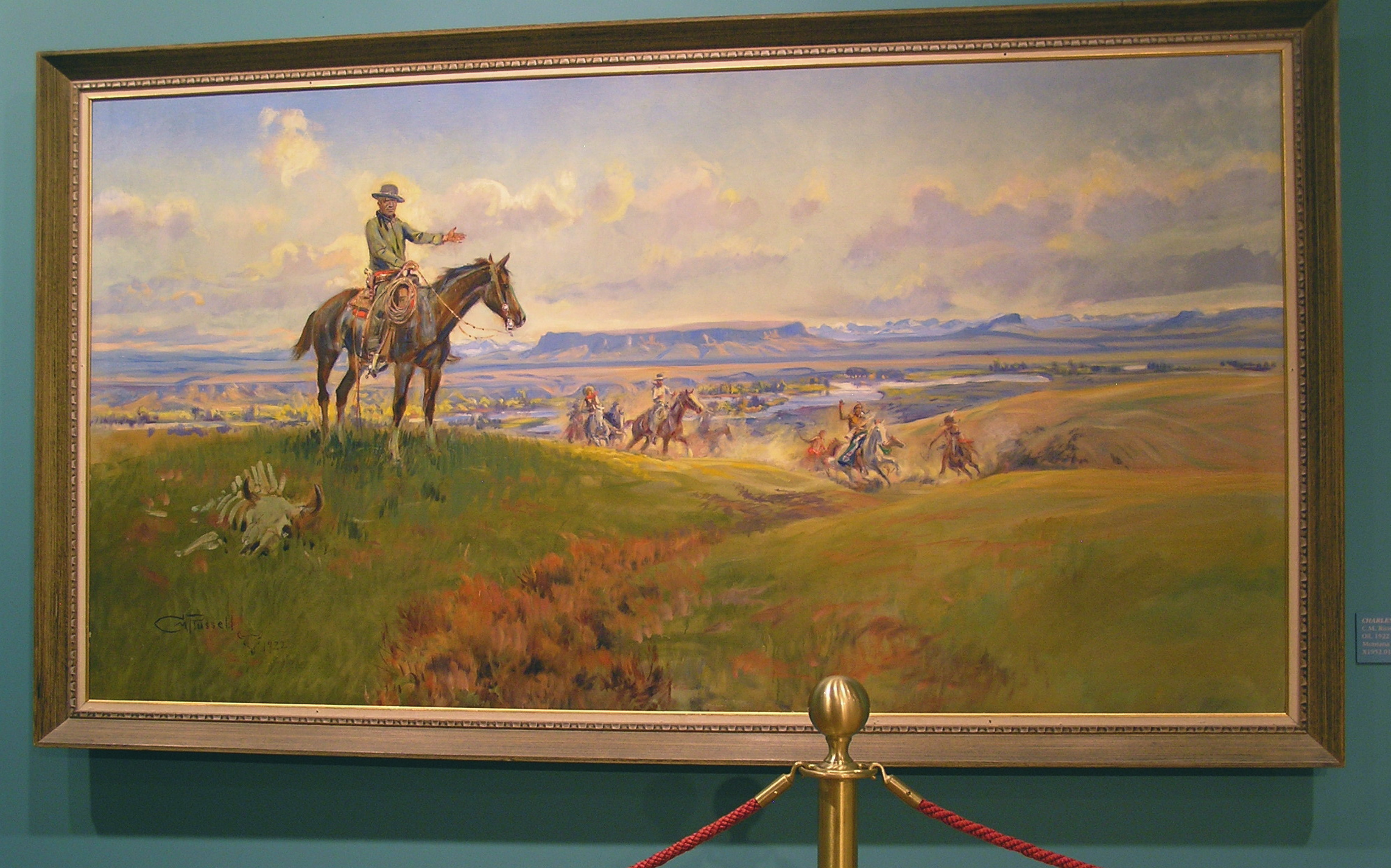
Charles Marion Russell and friends with Square Butte in the background

Charles Marion Russell, a famous painter of landscapes of the American West, utilized both Square Buttes as backgrounds in several of his paintings. The well-known painting Charles M. Russell and His Friends depicts the Cascade County Square Butte in the background. For a view of that painting showing the butte, click on the footnoted source. Another painting, The Tenderfoot, depicts the more compact Chouteau County Square Butte in the background. For a view of that painting showing the butte, click on the footnoted source.

== Additional buttes ==
- Square Butte, Daniels County, Montana, el. 2,897 feet (883 m), 48°55′47″N 105°15′02″W
- Square Butte, Garfield County, Montana, el. 3,058 feet (932 m), 47°21′56″N 107°36′07″W
- Square Butte, Garfield County, Montana, el. 2,831 feet (863 m), 47°42′24″N 106°30′12″W
- Square Butte, Glacier County, Montana, el. 4,570 feet (1,390 m), 48°44′43″N 112°49′17″W
- Square Butte, Hill County, Montana, el. 3,625 feet (1,105 m), 48°19′46″N 109°55′30″W
- Square Butte, Musselshell County, Montana, el. 4,528 feet (1,380 m), 46°18′36″N 108°13′10″W
- Square Butte, Phillips County, Montana, el. 2,933 feet (894 m), 47°46′21″N 107°35′41″W
- Square Butte, Roosevelt County, Montana, el. 2,572 feet (784 m), 48°30′47″N 105°13′21″W
- Square Butte, Stillwater County, Montana, el. 3,773 feet (1,150 m), 45°39′47″N 108°53′28″W

== See also ==
- List of mountains in Chouteau County, Montana
- List of mountains in Cascade County, Montana
