= Churchill Butte =

Mountain in Nevada, United States

Coordinates: 39°20′22″N 119°17′46″W

Churchill Butte is a summit in the U.S. state of Nevada. The elevation is 5,928 feet (1,807 m).

Churchill Butte was named after nearby Fort Churchill.
