= Haystack Butte =

Mountain in Montana, United States

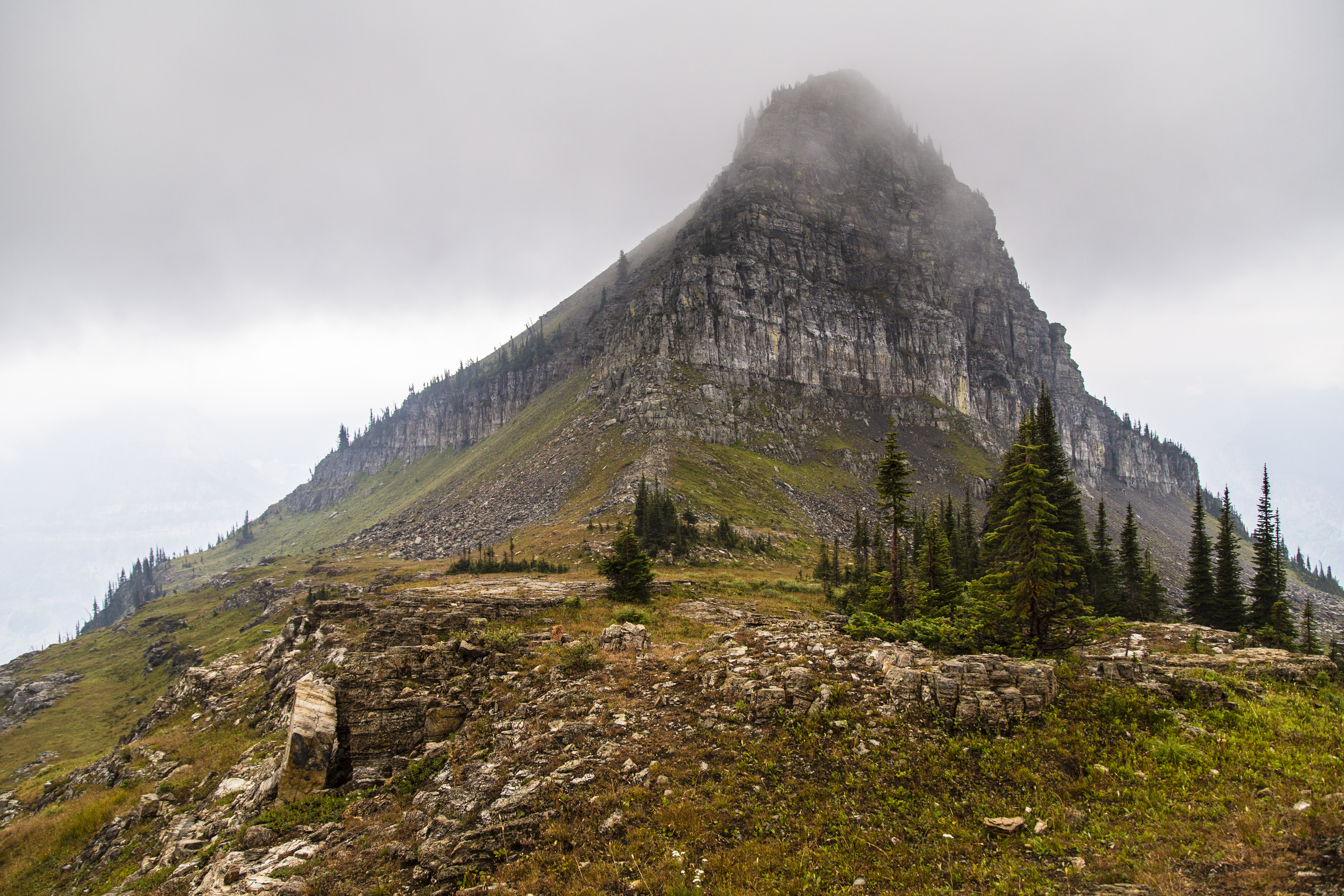
- Northeast aspect

Highest point
- Elevation: 7,486 ft (2,282 m)
- Prominence: 446 ft (136 m)
- Parent peak: Mount Gould (9,557 ft)
- Isolation: 1.06 mi (1.71 km)
- Coordinates: 48°43′58″N 113°43′58″W

Geography
- Location within Montana Location within the United States
- Location: Glacier National Park; Flathead County; Montana, U.S.
- Parent range: Lewis Range
- Topo map: USGS Logan Pass

Geology
- Rock type: Sedimentary rock

Climbing
- Easiest route: class 2 hiking

Haystack Butte is a 7,486-foot-elevation (2,282-meter) summit located in the Lewis Range, of Glacier National Park in the U.S. state of Montana. It is situated one mile west of the Continental Divide, in Flathead County, above the Weeping Wall on its south slope. Topographic relief is significant as the west aspect rises 3,900 feet (1,200 meters) above McDonald Creek in less than 1.5 mile. It can be seen from Logan Pass, and from Going-to-the-Sun Road which traverses the west and south slopes of the peak. The nearest higher neighbor is Mount Gould, 1.07 miles (1.72 km) to the northeast. Climbing access is via the Highline Trail. This geographical feature's descriptive name was on maps as early as 1904, and was officially adopted March 6, 1929, by the United States Board on Geographic Names

== Climate ==
Based on the Köppen climate classification, Haystack Butte is located in an alpine subarctic climate zone with long, cold, snowy winters, and cool to warm summers. Temperatures can drop below −10 °F with wind chill factors below −30 °F. Precipitation runoff from the peak drains into McDonald Creek, thence Lake McDonald.

== Geology ==
Like other mountains in Glacier National Park, Haystack Butte Tail is composed of sedimentary rock laid down during the Precambrian to Jurassic periods. Formed in shallow seas, this sedimentary rock was initially uplifted beginning 170 million years ago when the Lewis Overthrust fault pushed an enormous slab of precambrian rocks 3 mi (4.8 km) thick, 50 miles (80 km) wide and 160 miles (260 km) long over younger rock of the cretaceous period. The bulk of the peak is composed of limestone of the Siyeh Formation, with a diorite cap.

== Gallery ==
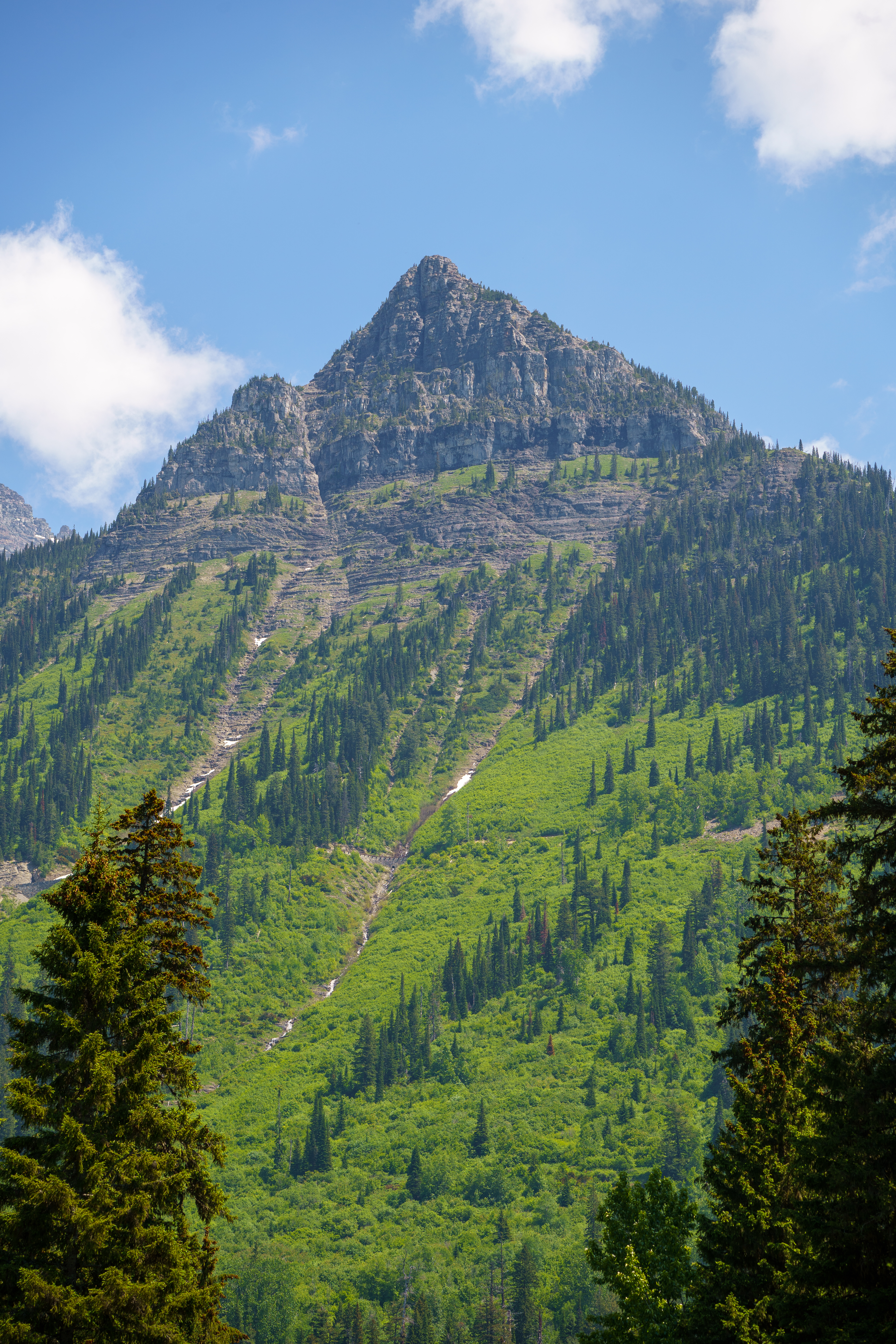
Southwest aspect

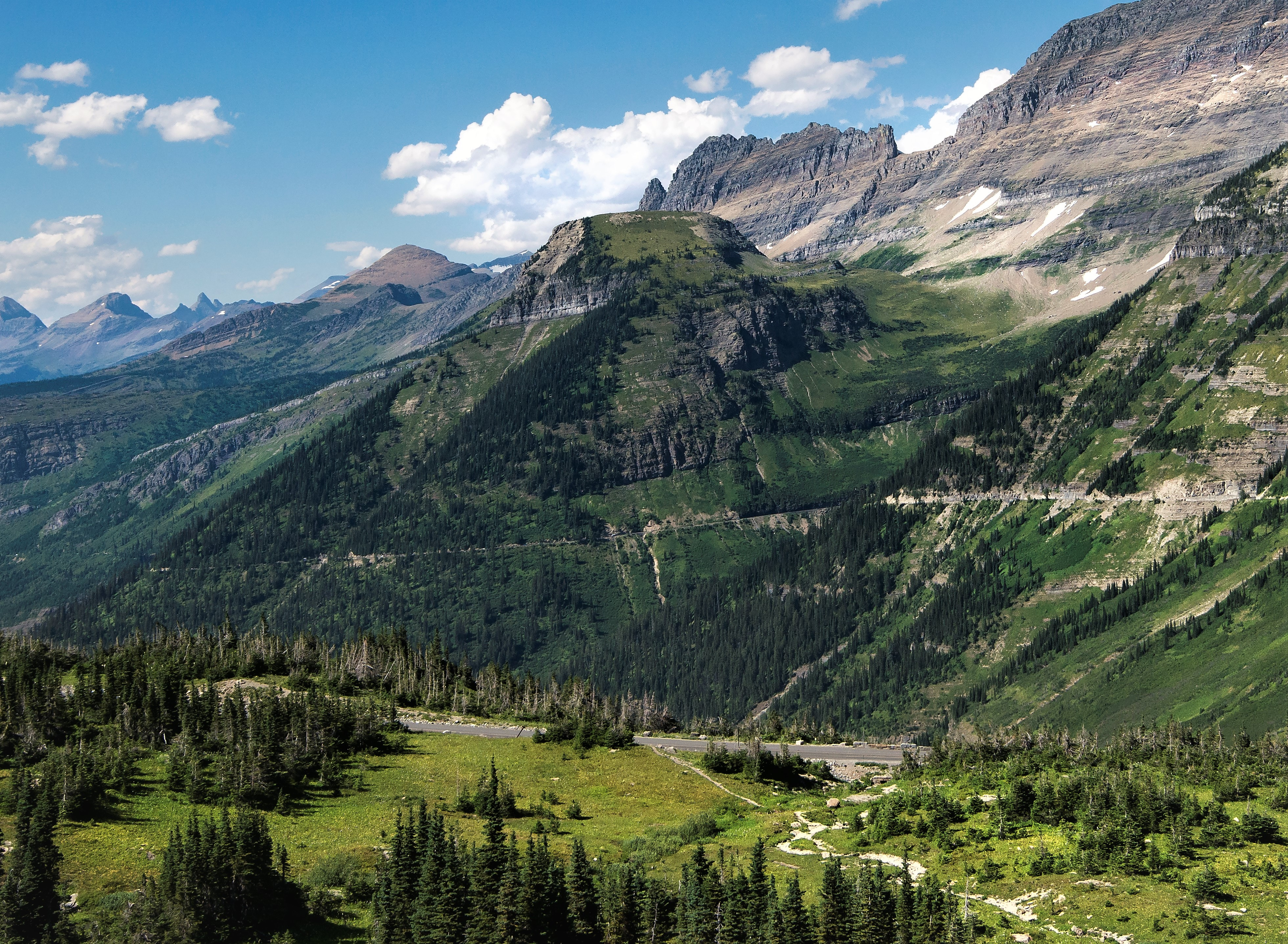
South aspect centered, from Logan Pass area

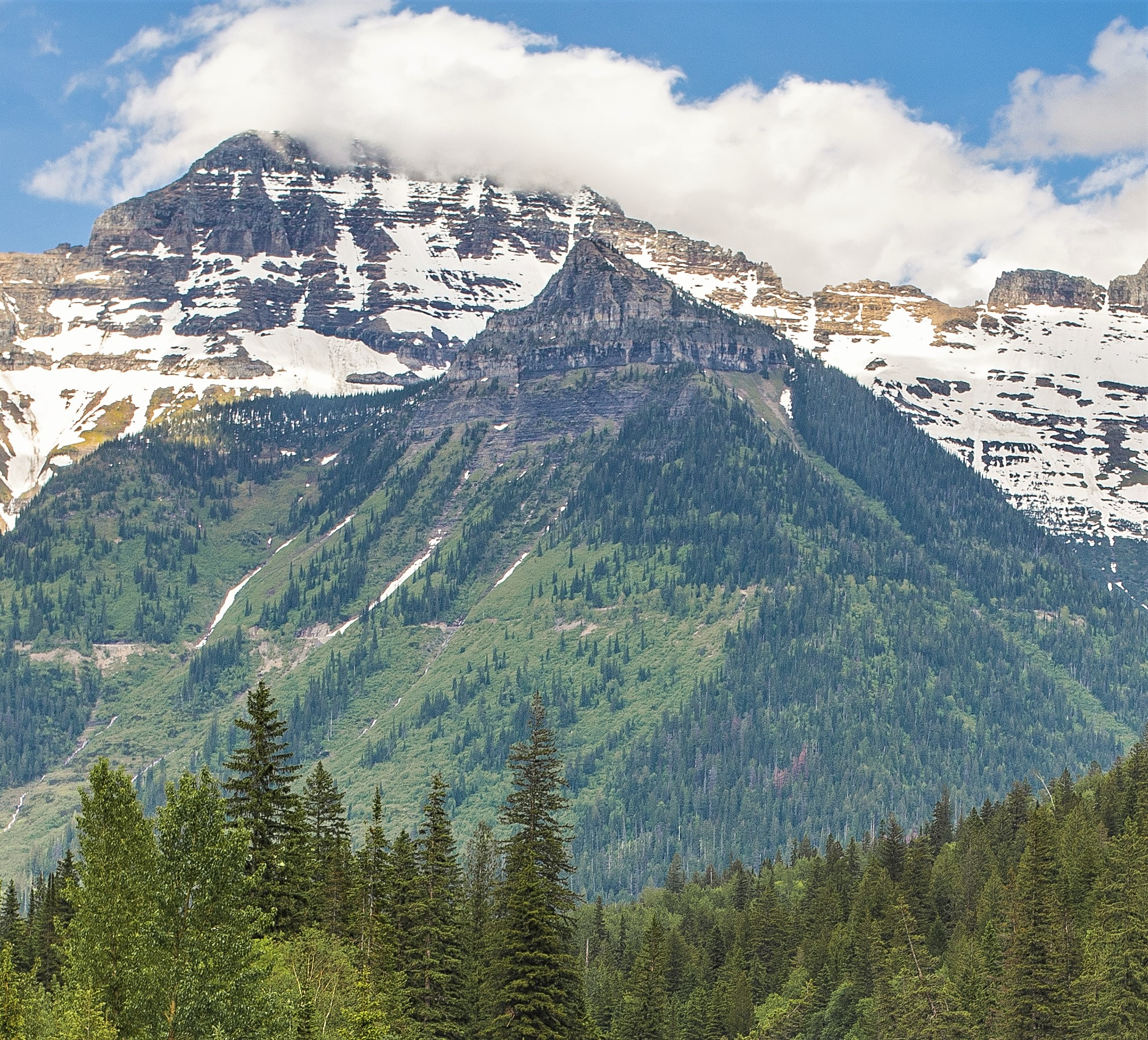
West aspect of Haystack Butte, with Mt. Gould behind

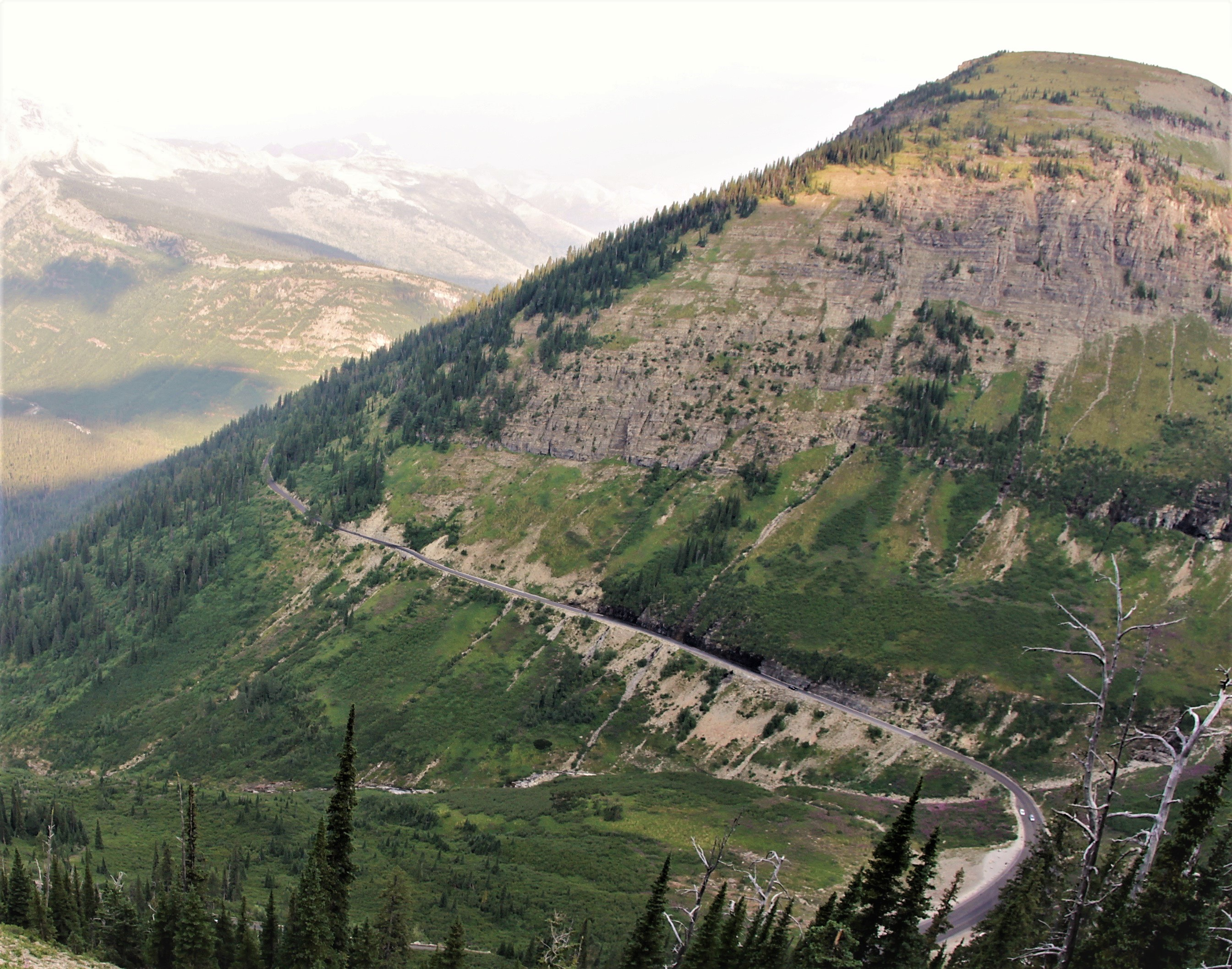
Haystack Butte, Going-to-the-Sun Road, and Weeping Wall seen from Highline Trail

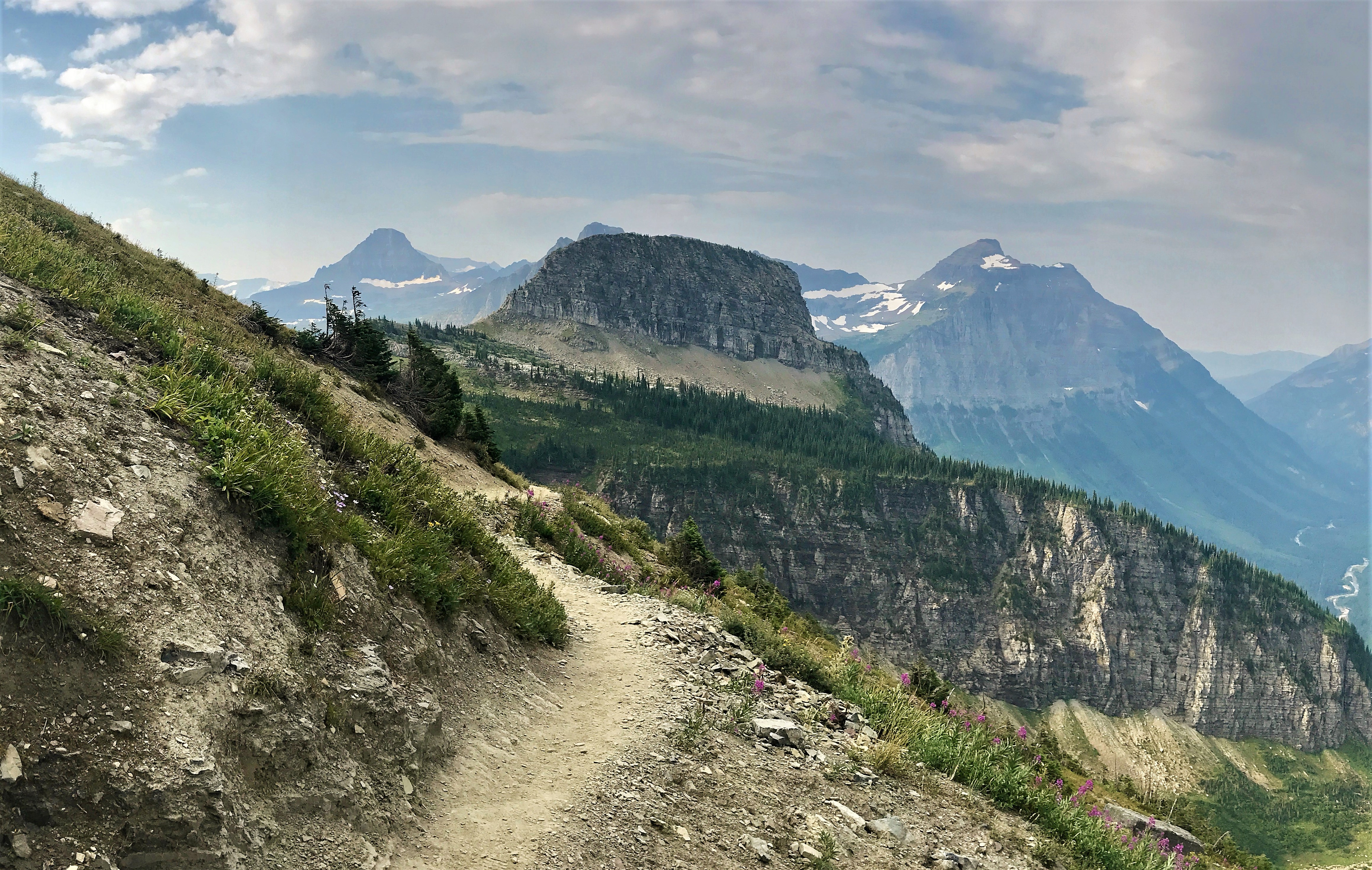
North aspect from Highline Trail

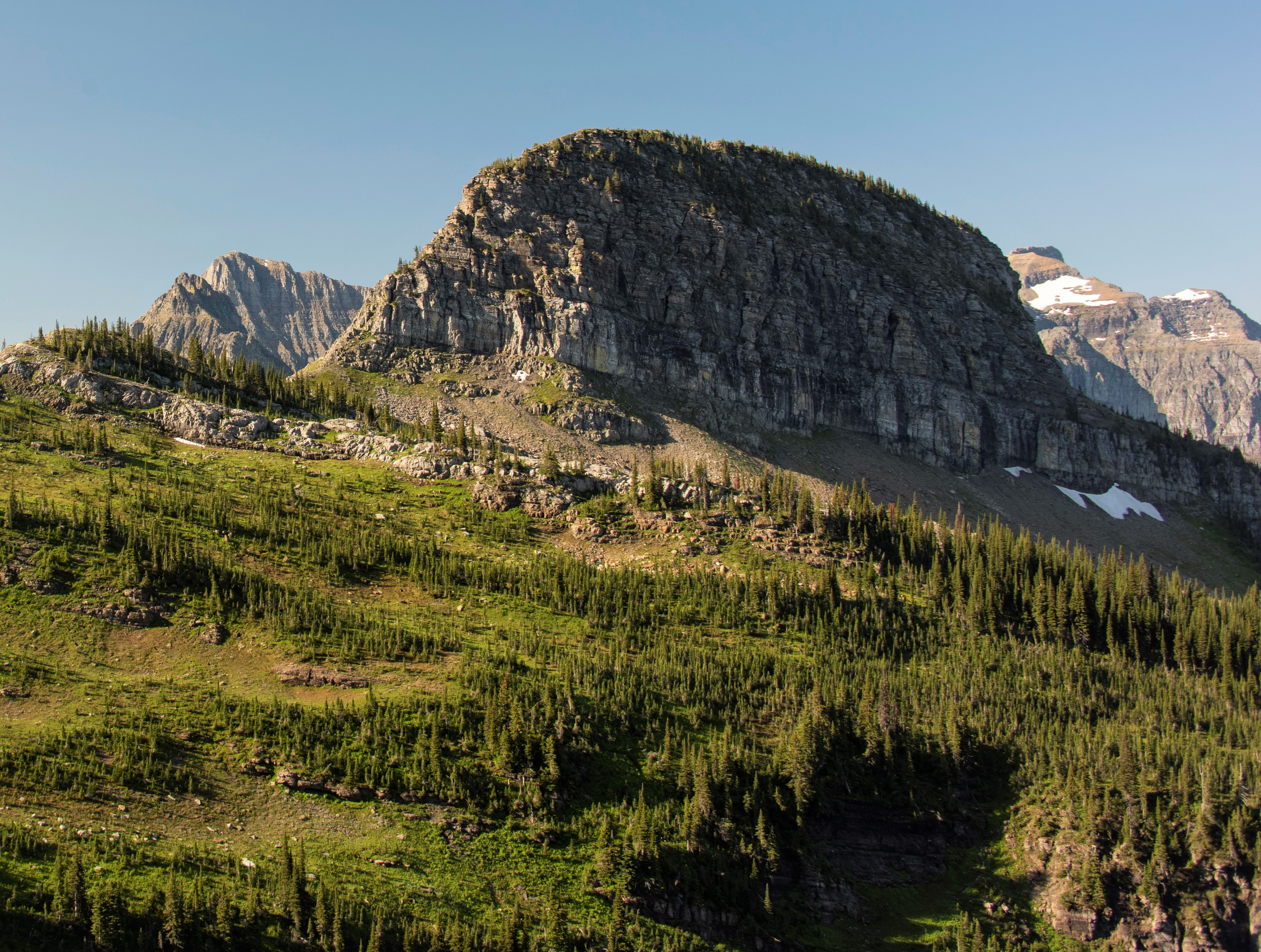
North aspect

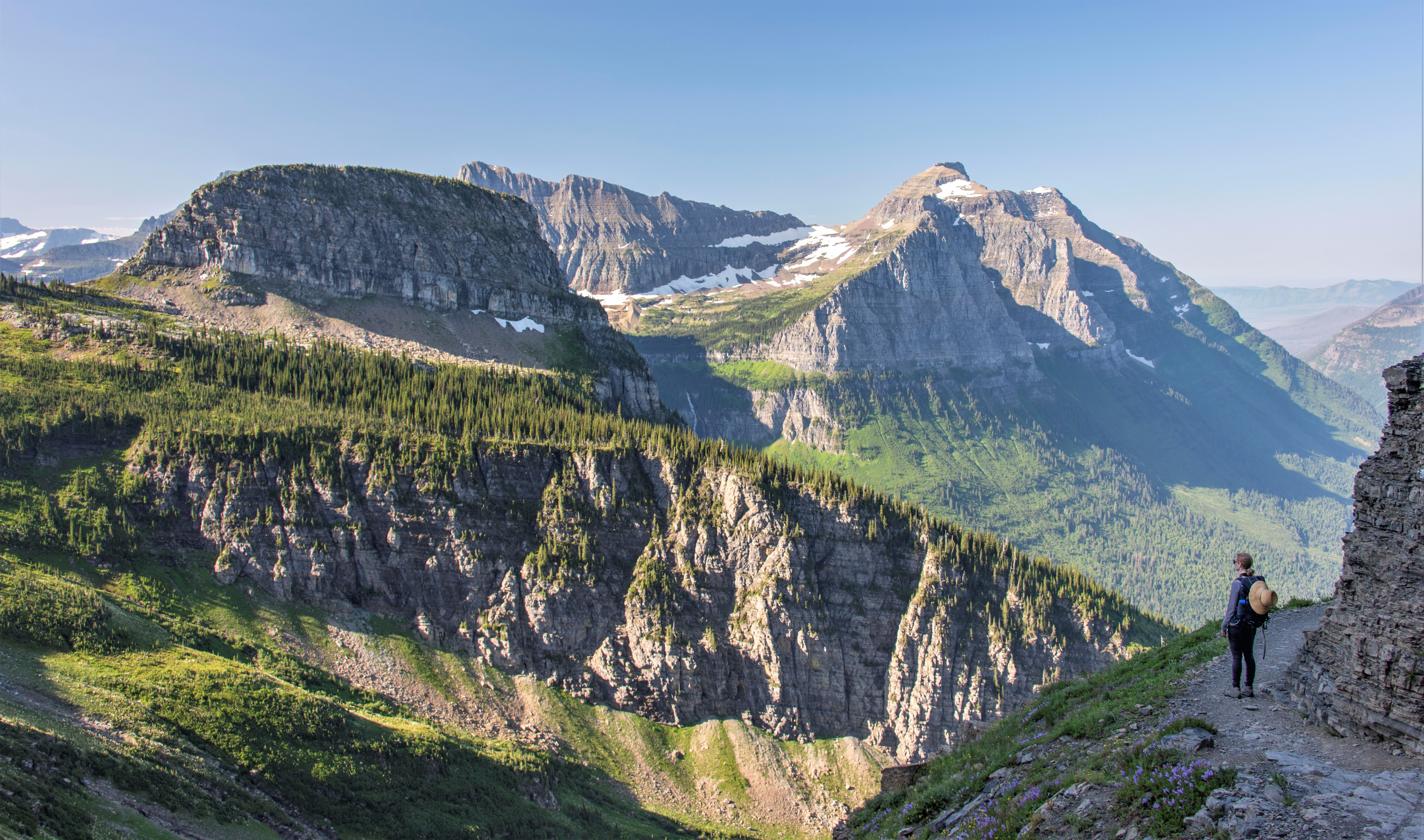
Haystack Butte (left) and Mt. Cannon (right), seen from Highline Trail

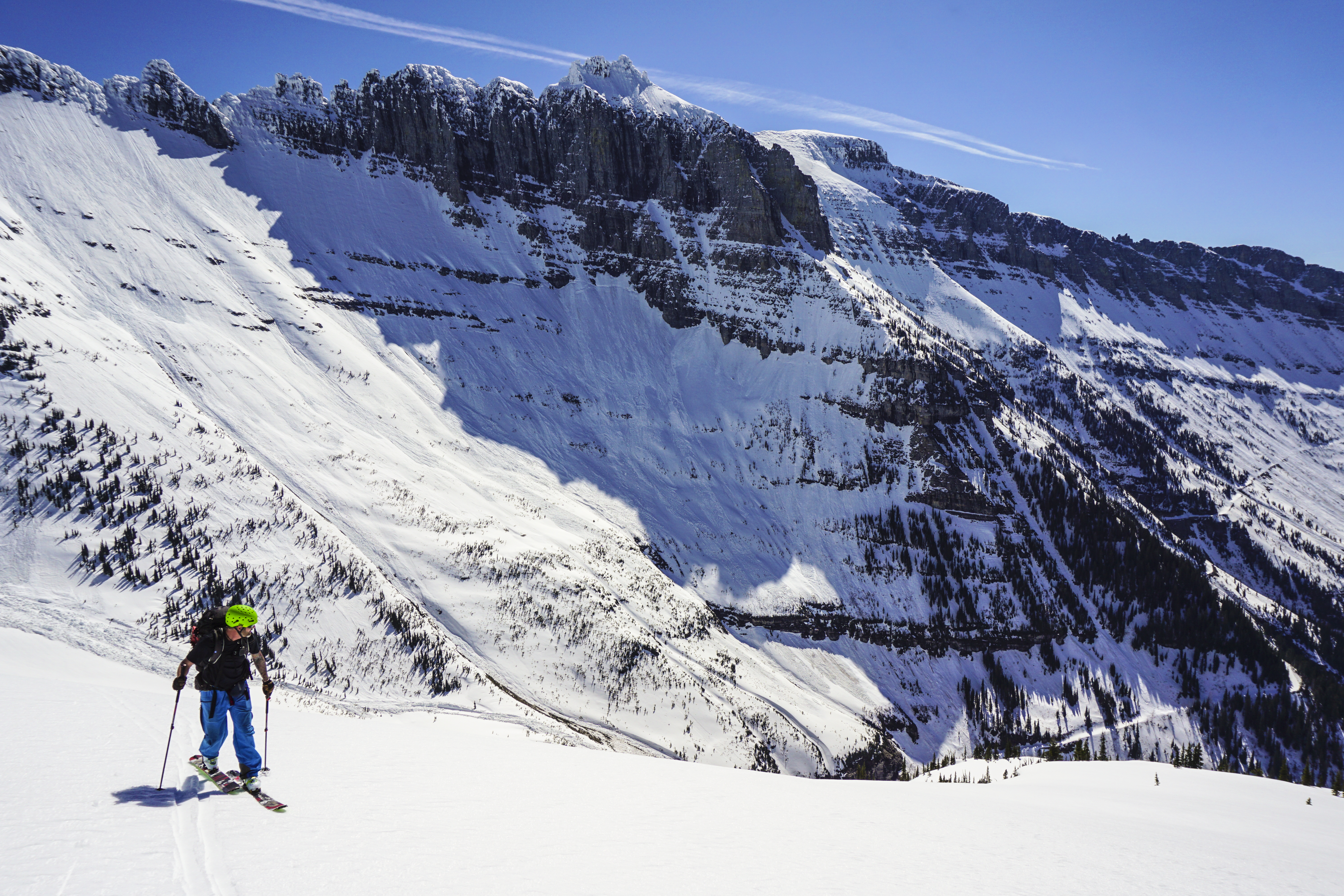
Avalanche Team skier on Haystack Butte summit, with Garden Wall, Bishops Cap, and Pollock Mountain in the background.

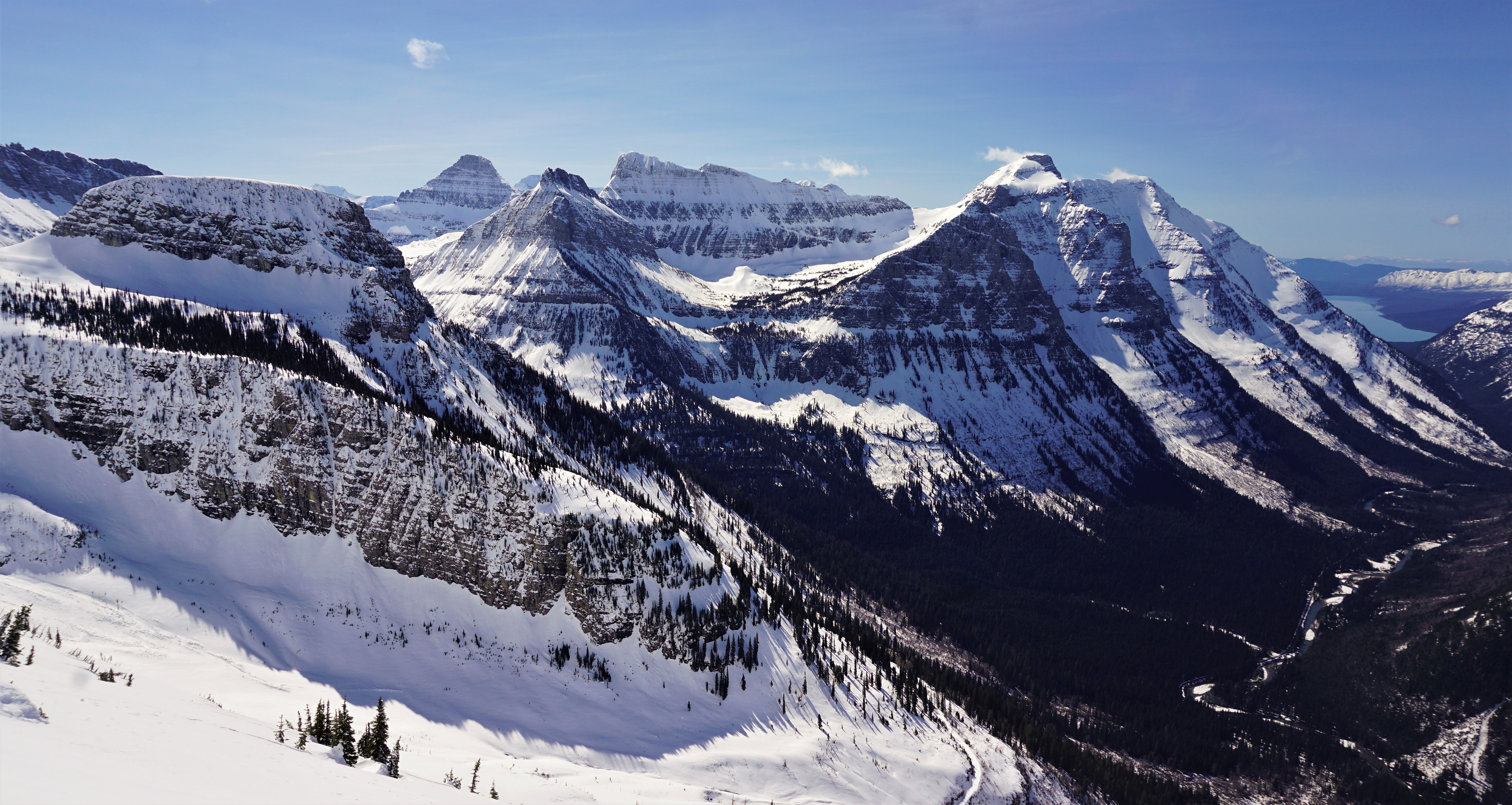
Left to rightː Haystack Butte, Reynolds Mountain, Mt. Oberlin, Clements Mountain, Mt. Cannon

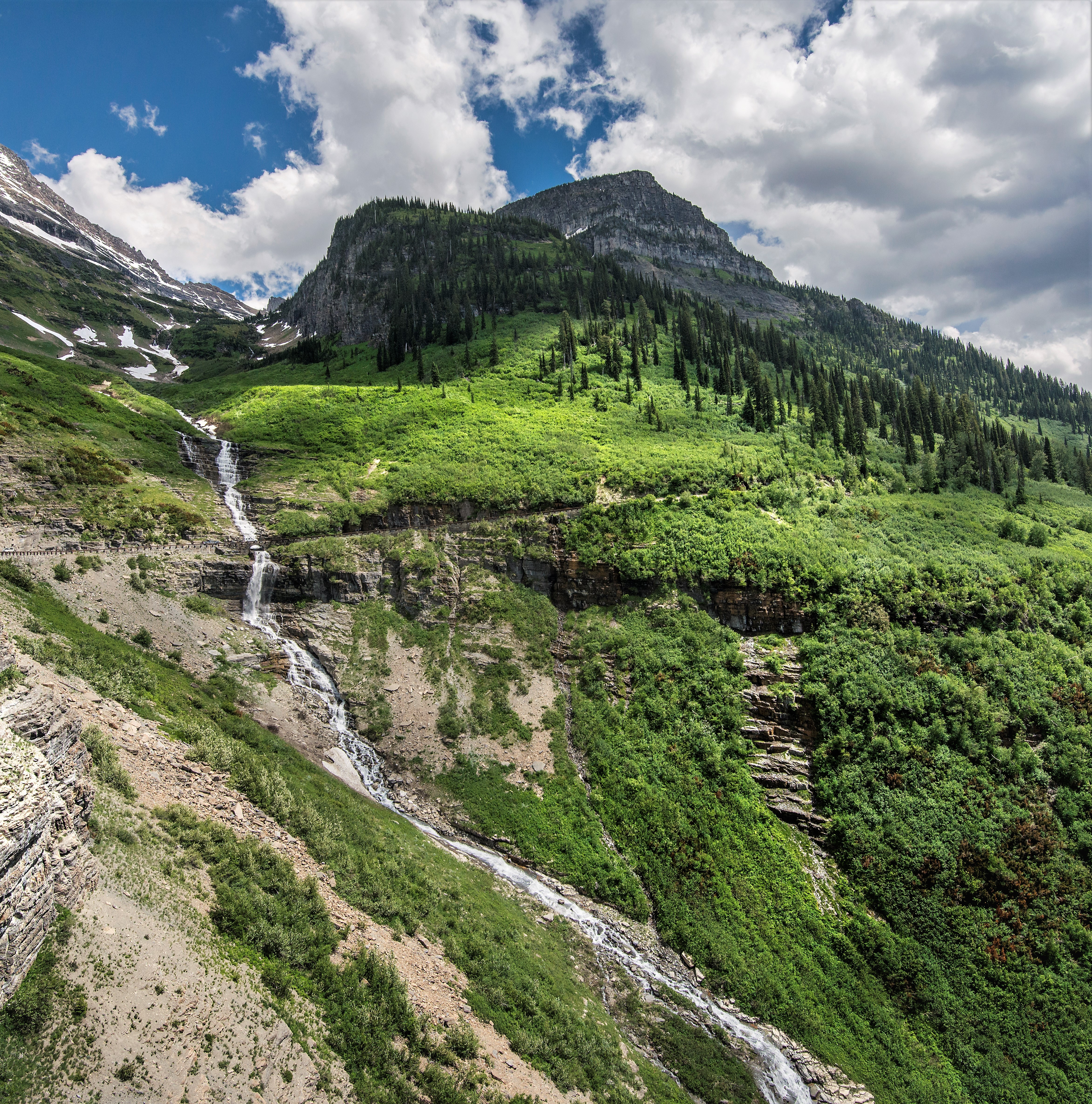
Haystack Butte and Haystack Creek Falls seen from northwest along the Going-to-the-Sun Road.

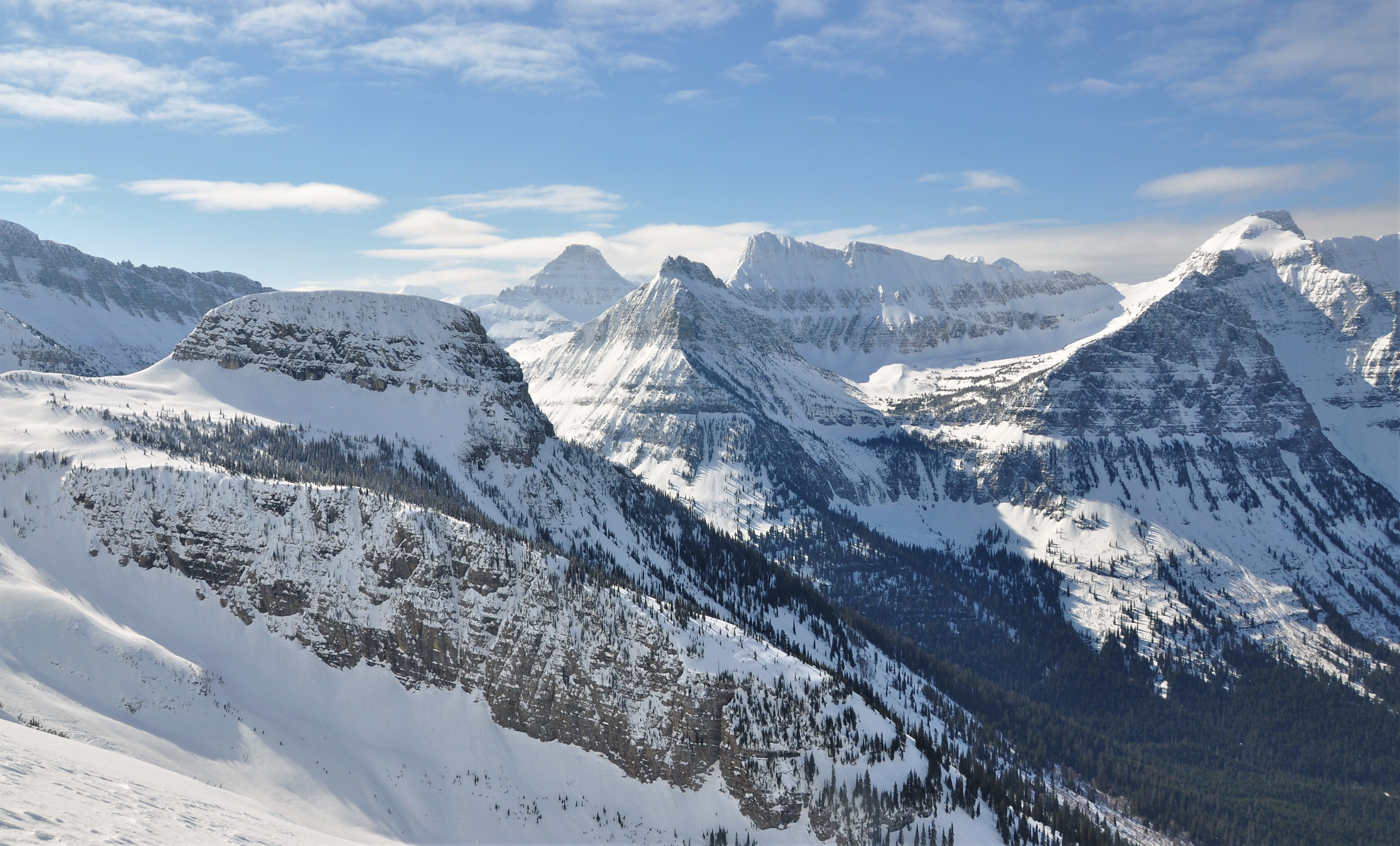
Left to rightː Haystack Butte, Reynolds Mountain, Mt. Oberlin, Clements Mountain, Mt. Cannon

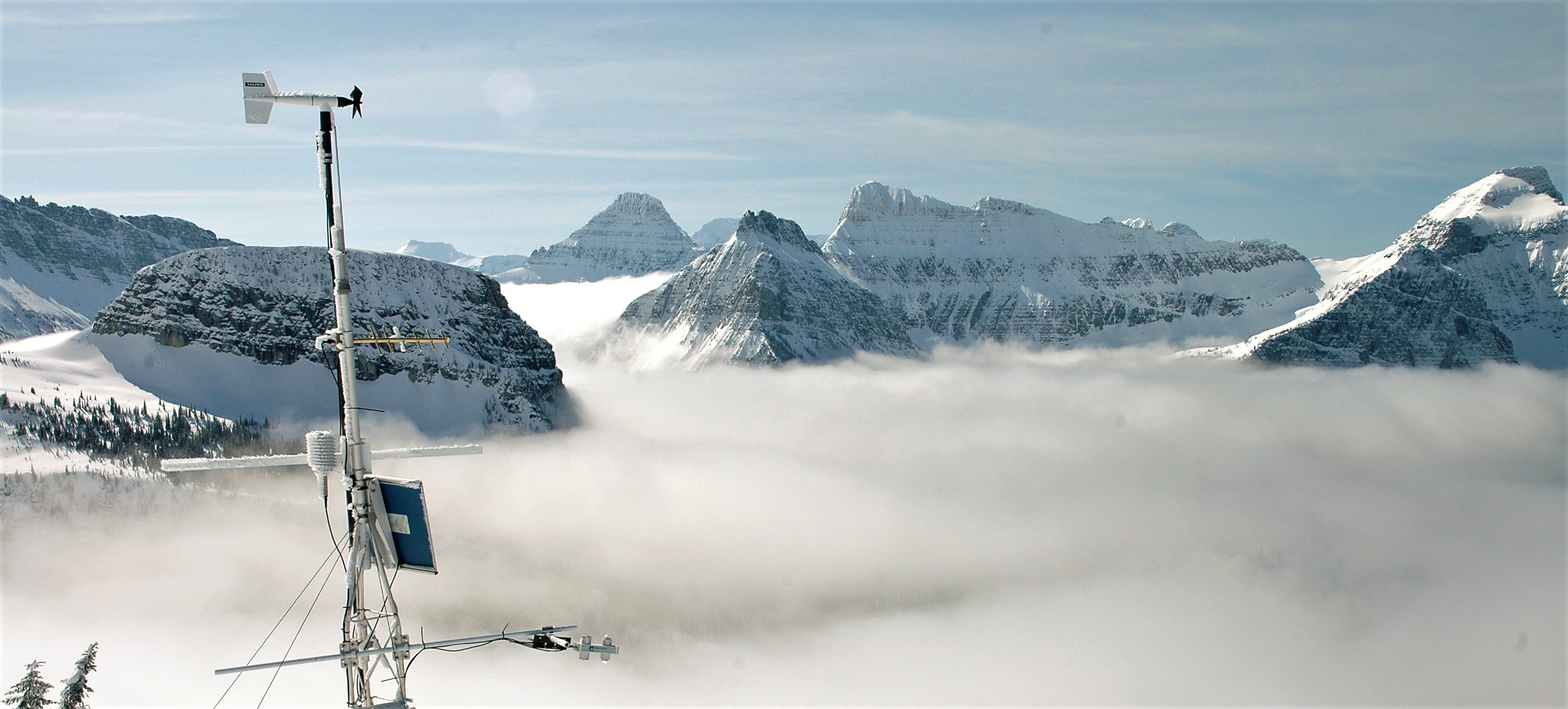
Left to rightː Haystack Butte, Reynolds Mountain, Mt. Oberlin, Clements Mountain, and Mt. Cannon seen from Garden Wall Weather Station.

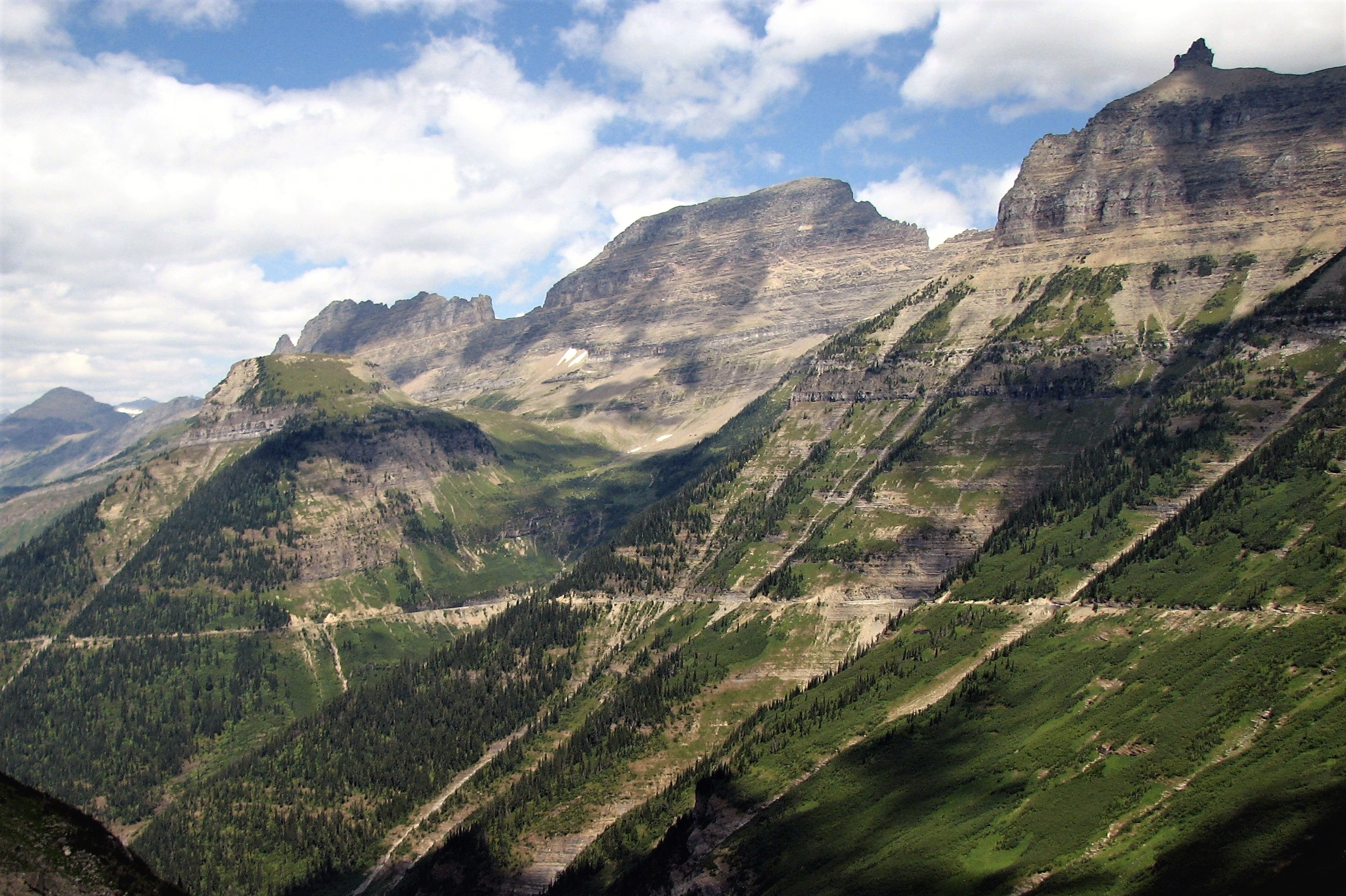
Haystack Butte, Mt. Gould, and Bishops Cap

== See also ==
- Geology of the Rocky Mountains
- List of mountains and mountain ranges of Glacier National Park (U.S.)
